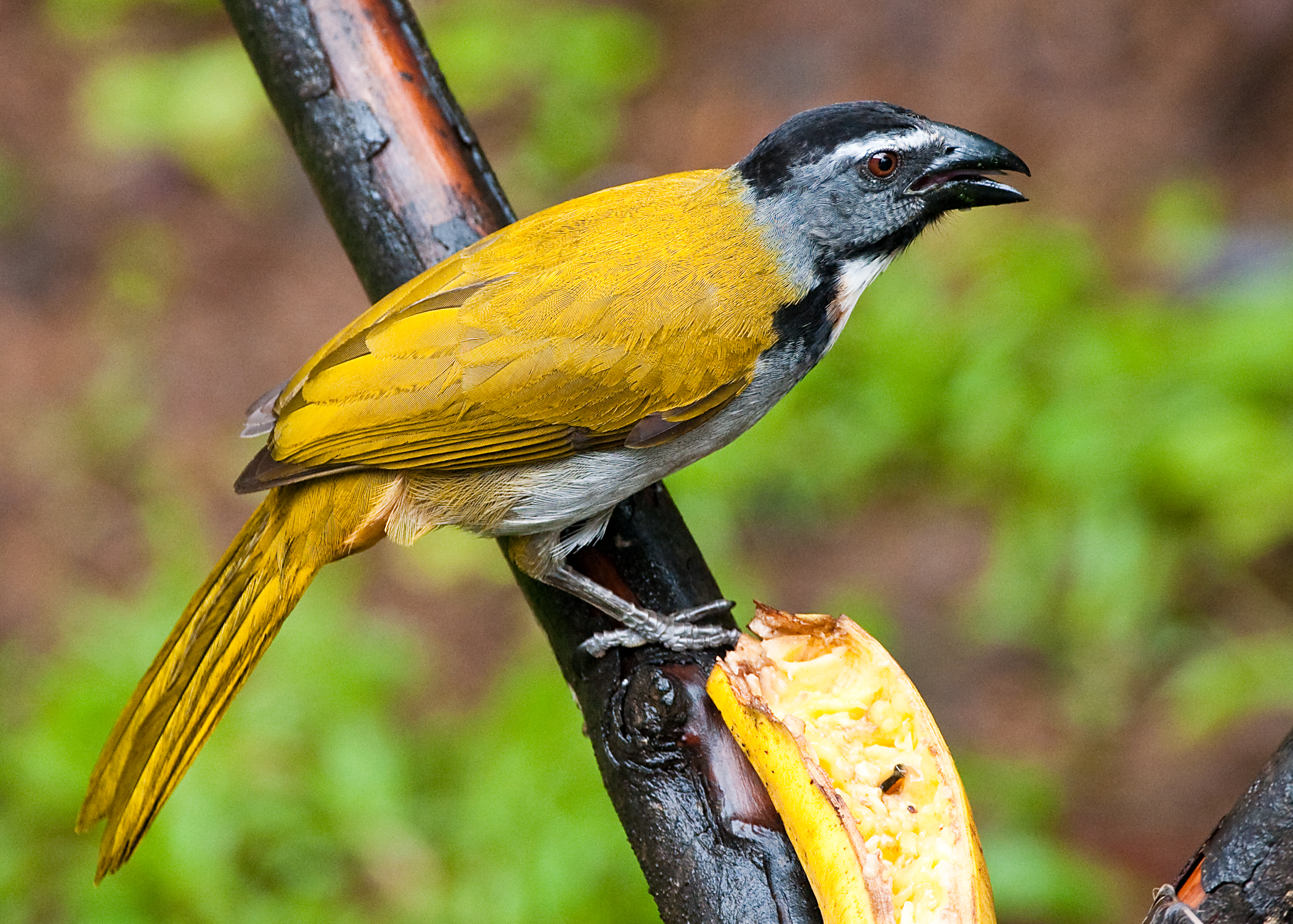
- At Cordillera de Talamanca, Costa Rica

Conservation status
- Least Concern (IUCN 3.1)

Scientific classification
- Kingdom: Animalia
- Phylum: Chordata
- Class: Aves
- Order: Passeriformes
- Family: Thraupidae
- Genus: Saltator
- Species: S. atriceps

Binomial name
- Saltator atriceps (Lesson, RP, 1832)

= Black-headed saltator =

Species of bird

The black-headed saltator (Saltator atriceps) is a species of songbird in the family Thraupidae, the tanagers and allies. It is found from Mexico to Panama.

== Taxonomy and systematics ==
The black-headed saltator was formally described in 1832 with the binomial Tanagra (Saltator) atriceps.

The black-headed saltator has these six subspecies:

- S. a. atriceps (Lesson, RP, 1832)
- S. a. suffuscus Wetmore, 1942
- S. a. flavicrissus Griscom, 1937
- S. a. peeti Brodkorb, 1940
- S. a. raptor (Cabot, S, 1845)
- S. a. lacertosus Bangs, 1900

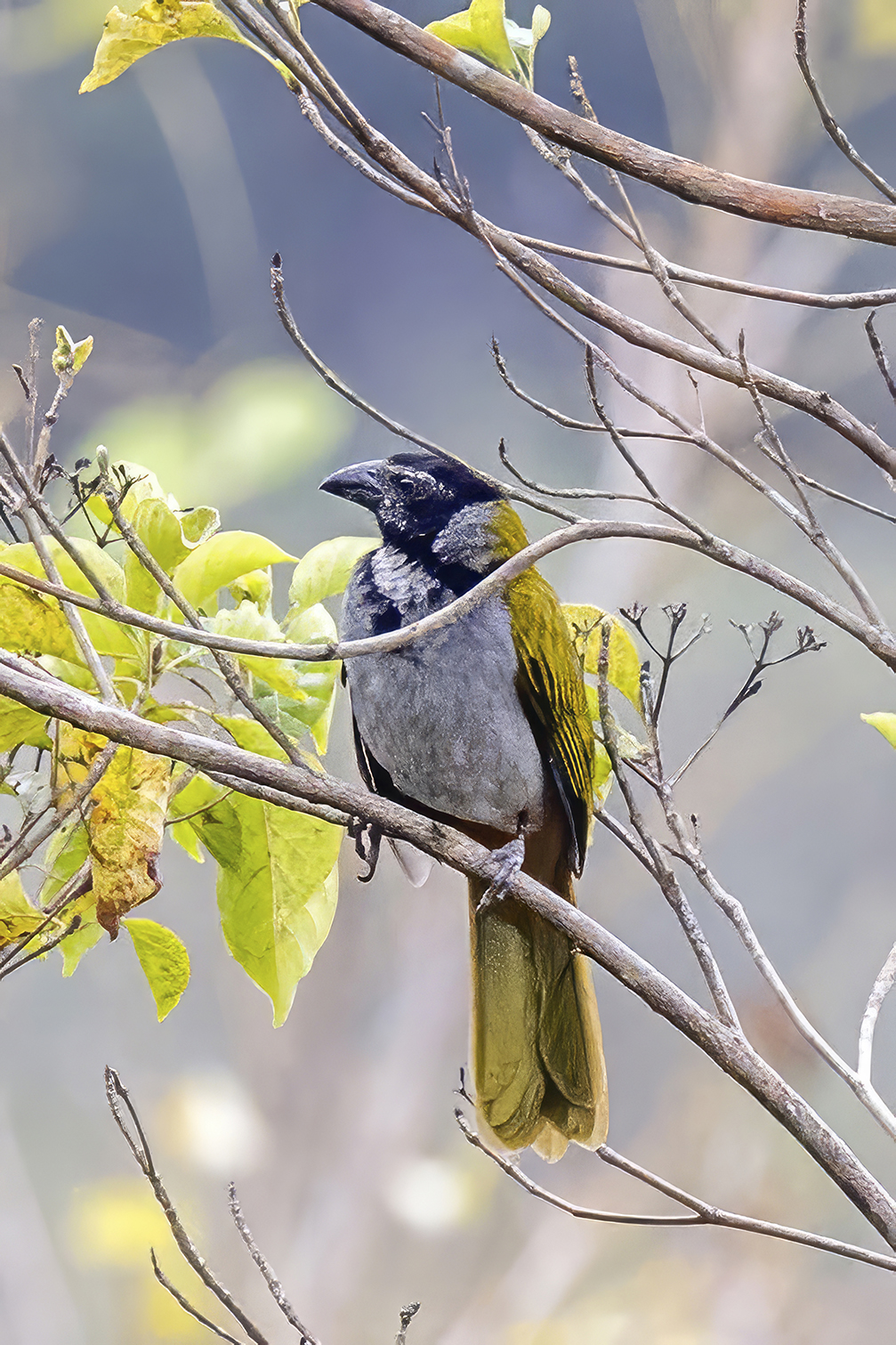
Showing white throat patch and black bib

== Description ==
The black-headed saltator is 25.5 to 28 cm (10 to 11 in) long and weighs about 71 to 93 g (2.5 to 3.3 oz). The sexes have the same plumage. Adults of the nominate subspecies S. a. atriceps have a mostly black head with a thin supercilium to just past the eye; it begins gray and becomes white to the rear. Their face is gray below the eye and onto the cheek. Their back, scapulars, rump, uppertail coverts, wings, and tail are bright yellowish olive-green; it is brightest on the tail. The flight- and tail feathers have black shafts. The center of their throat and their upper breast are white surrounded by black. Their lower breast and belly are ash-gray that pales to the rear, their lower flanks ash-gray with a brown tinge, and their undertail coverts orange ochraceous. Their tibial feathers are brown or pale olive.

The other subspecies of the black-headed saltator differ from the nominate and each other thus:

- S. a. suffuscus: like nominate but with a cinnamon throat center
- S. a. flavicrissus: smaller white throat than nominate with wider black breast band, less brown wash on flanks, and more olive ochraceous undertail coverts
- S. a. peeti: larger than nominate but otherwise the same
- S. a. raptor: paler underparts than nominate with flanks similar to upperparts
- S. a. lacertosus: mostly slate-gray face, all-white supercilium, and little or no black breast band

All subspecies have a brownish red or reddish brown iris, a thick black bill, and dark horn or dusky legs and feet.

== Distribution and habitat ==
The black-headed saltator has a disjunct distribution. Subspecies S. a. flavicrissus is separate from all the others, whose ranges are contiguous. The subspecies are found thus:

- S. a. atriceps: Gulf slope from southern Tamaulipas in northeastern Mexico south to Guatemala, then on Caribbean and Pacific slopes through Guatemala and Belize, and south through all of Honduras and central Nicaragua through most of eastern Costa Rica (but skipping coastal southeastern Veracruz and the Yucatán Peninsula)
- S. a. suffuscus: Sierra de Los Tuxtlas in southeastern Veracruz
- S. a. flavicrissus: Pacific slope of Mexico from central Guerrero south to Oaxaca short of the Isthmus of Tehuantepec
- S. a. peeti: southern Mexico in Oaxaca east of the Isthmus and Chiapas
- S. a. raptor: Yucatán, Quintana Roo, and Campeche states on the Yucatán Peninsula
- S. a. lacertosus: from extreme eastern Costa Rica east to the Canal Zone in Panama

The black-headed saltator inhabits a variety of landscapes in the tropical and lower subtropical zones. These include the edges of humid to semi-arid forest, younger secondary forest, plantations, brushy and scrubby areas, and gardens. In elevation it ranges from sea level to 1,750 m (5,700 ft) in Mexico, to 1,900 m (6,200 ft) in northern Central America, and to 1,300 m (4,300 ft) in Costa Rica.

== Behavior ==
=== Movement ===
The black-headed saltator is a year-round resident.

=== Feeding ===
The black-headed saltator's diet has not been studied but is known to include fruits, seeds, and insects and smaller amounts of flowers and buds. It has been observed feeding on the fruits of Bursera simaruba, Ficus cotinifolia, Ehretia tinifolia, and Palicourea padifolia. A study in southern Mexico added Cymbopetalum mayanum and Trophis racemosa fruits. It forages at all levels of its habitat, typically in small groups, and it occasionally joins mixed-species feeding flocks. It takes most food by gleaning from vegetation.

=== Breeding ===
The black-headed saltator's breeding season has not been fully established but includes May and June in Mexico, spans April to July in Cost Rica, and includes March and April in Panama. Its nest is a cup made from a wide variety of plant fibers, sometimes on a base of twigs, and is lined with fine fibers. Nests are typically in a thicket within about 1 to 3 m (3 to 10 ft) of the ground. The clutch is two eggs that are blue or bluish green with black markings. The eggs are about 24 to 33 mm (0.94 to 1.3 in) long and about 18 to 23 mm (0.71 to 0.91 in) wide. They weigh about 5 to 5.5 g (0.18 to 0.19 oz). They are among the largest eggs of the saltators. The incubation period, time to fledging, and details of parental care are not known.

=== Vocalization ===
The black-headed saltator's day song is described as "loud, scratchy notes ending with a prolonged, upwardly inflected whistle: cher ch-ch cher jur jur weeeee" and as "sharp, nasal notes run into a gruff, accelerating, rolling laugh or chortling chatter". Its dawn song is "a high, thin tseety, tseety-tseety-tseety-tseety". Its "sharp, loud, raucous" calls include "a single descending deeuh or deeer" and "sharp, smacking barks, chowk! or cheuk!, etc., and a sharp yah! or chehh!, repeated".

== Status ==
The IUCN has assessed the black-headed saltator as being of Least Concern. It has a very large range; its estimated population of at least 500,000 mature individuals is believed to be decreasing. No immediate threats have been identified. It is considered common in northern Central America and Costa Rica. "Increased logging and habitat fragmentation can prove to be a boon for this forest edge species; for example, at Palenque, Chiapas, in southern Mexico, the increased fragmentation of rainforest has led to an increase of the local population of Black-headed Saltator."
