= Cymbopetalum mayanum =

- Herbarium specimen of C. mayanum from the National Museum of Natural History

Conservation status
- Least Concern (IUCN 3.1)

Scientific classification
- Kingdom: Plantae
- Clade: Tracheophytes
- Clade: Angiosperms
- Clade: Magnoliids
- Order: Magnoliales
- Family: Annonaceae
- Genus: Cymbopetalum
- Species: C. mayanum

Binomial name
- Cymbopetalum mayanum Lundell 1974

Species of flowering plant

Cymbopetalum mayanum is a species of flowering plant in family Annonaceae. The specific epithet mayanum refers to the Mayan region in which it is indigenous, specifically the Petén lowland forests of Guatemala and the Atlantic moist forests of Honduras. It grows as a tree, and may be threatened by habitat loss due to deforestation. It is native to Belize, Guatemala, Honduras, and southeastern Mexico.

Common names for C. mayanum include Mayan cymbopetalum, huevo de toro, muk, anona de montaña, banana, guanabano, guinellito, guineo, gunchuch, mata boni, mataboni, naguate, sufricaya, tulmax, chikinte, and naguate

Mayan cymbopetalum provides food for ants and many species of birds, including:

- Yellow-billed cacique (Amblycercus holosericeus)
- Orange-billed sparrow (Arremon aurantiirostris)
- Bright-rumped attila (Attila spadiceus)
- Pale-billed woodpecker (Campephilus guatemalensis)
- Black-faced grosbeak (Caryothraustes poliogaster)
- Swainson's thrush (Catharus ustulatus)
- Brown jay (Cyanocorax morio)
- Chestnut-sided warbler (Dendroica pensylvanica)
- Grey catbird (Dumetella carolinensis)
- Red-throated ant tanager (Habia fuscicauda)
- Wood thrush (Hylocichla mustelina)
- Black-throated shrike-tanager (Lanio aurantius)
- White-collared manakin (Manacus candei)
- Golden-fronted woodpecker (Melanerpes aurifrons)
- Black-cheeked woodpecker (Melanerpes pucherani)
- Ochre-bellied flycatcher (Mionectes oleagineus)
- Lesson's motmot (Momotus lessonii)
- Great crested flycatcher (Myiarchus crinitus)
- Dusky-capped flycatcher (Myiarchus tuberculifer)
- Brown-crested flycatcher (Myiarchus tyrannulus)
- Sulphur-bellied flycatcher (Myiodynastes luteiventris)
- Social flycatcher (Myiozetetes similis)
- Kentucky warbler (Oporornis formosus)
- Grey-collared becard (Pachyramphus major)
- Rose-breasted grosbeak (Pheucticus ludovicianus)
- Red-capped manakin (Pipra mentalis)
- Scarlet tanager (Piranga olivacea)
- Summer tanager (Piranga rubra)
- Keel-billed toucan (Ramphastos sulfuratus)
- Crimson-collared tanager (Ramphocelus sanguinolentus)
- Rufous mourner (Rhytipterna holerythra)
- Black-headed saltator (Saltator atriceps)
- Buff-throated saltator (Saltator maximus)
- Thrush-like schiffornis (Schiffornis turdinus agg.)
- Ovenbird (Seiurus aurocapillus)
- Yellow-winged tanager (Thraupis abbas)
- Masked tityra (Tityra semifasciata)
- Tropical kingbird (Tyrannus melancholicus)
- Yellow-green vireo (Vireo flavoviridis)
- Red-eyed vireo (Vireo olivaceous)
