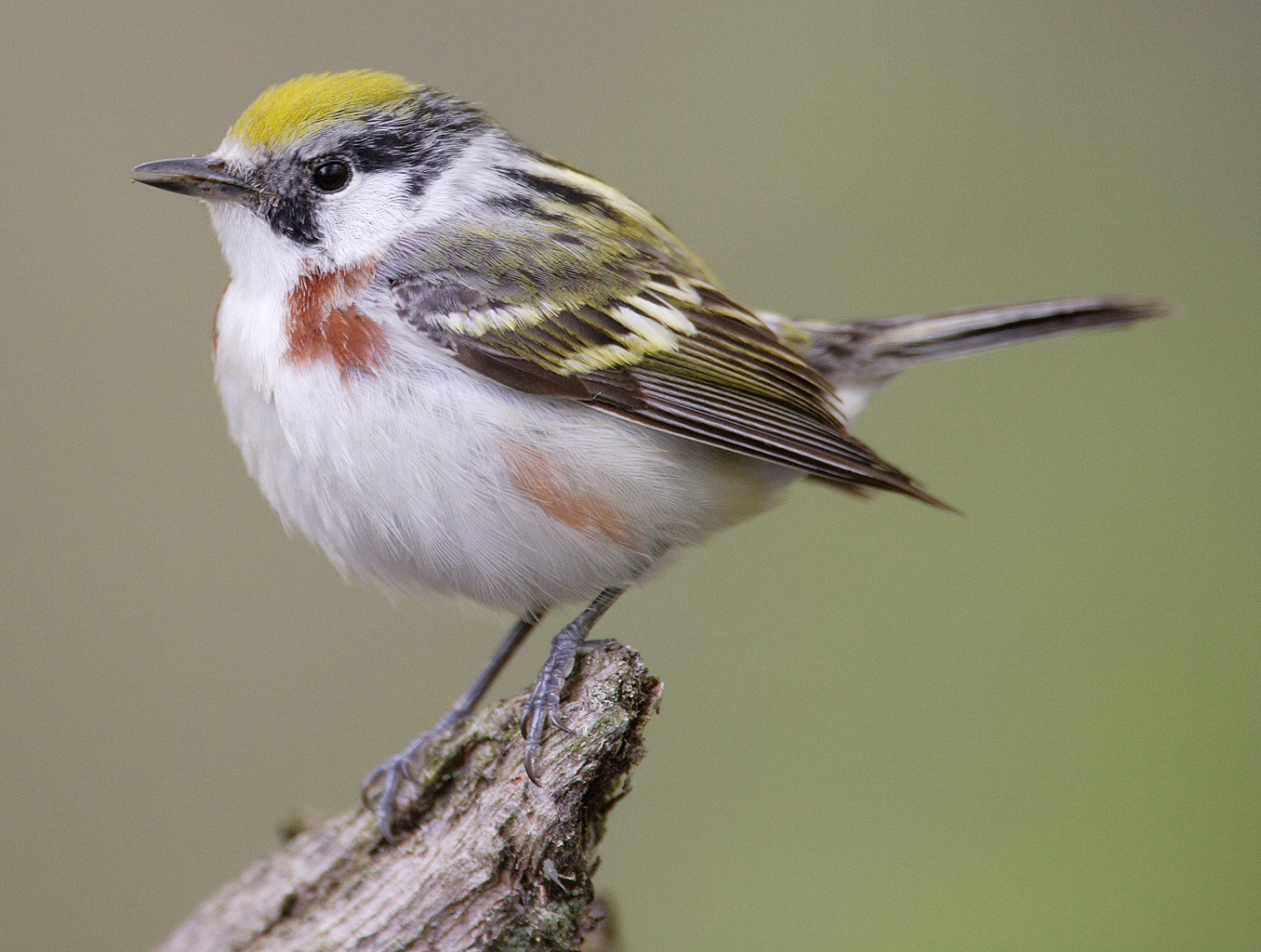
- Adult in summer plumage
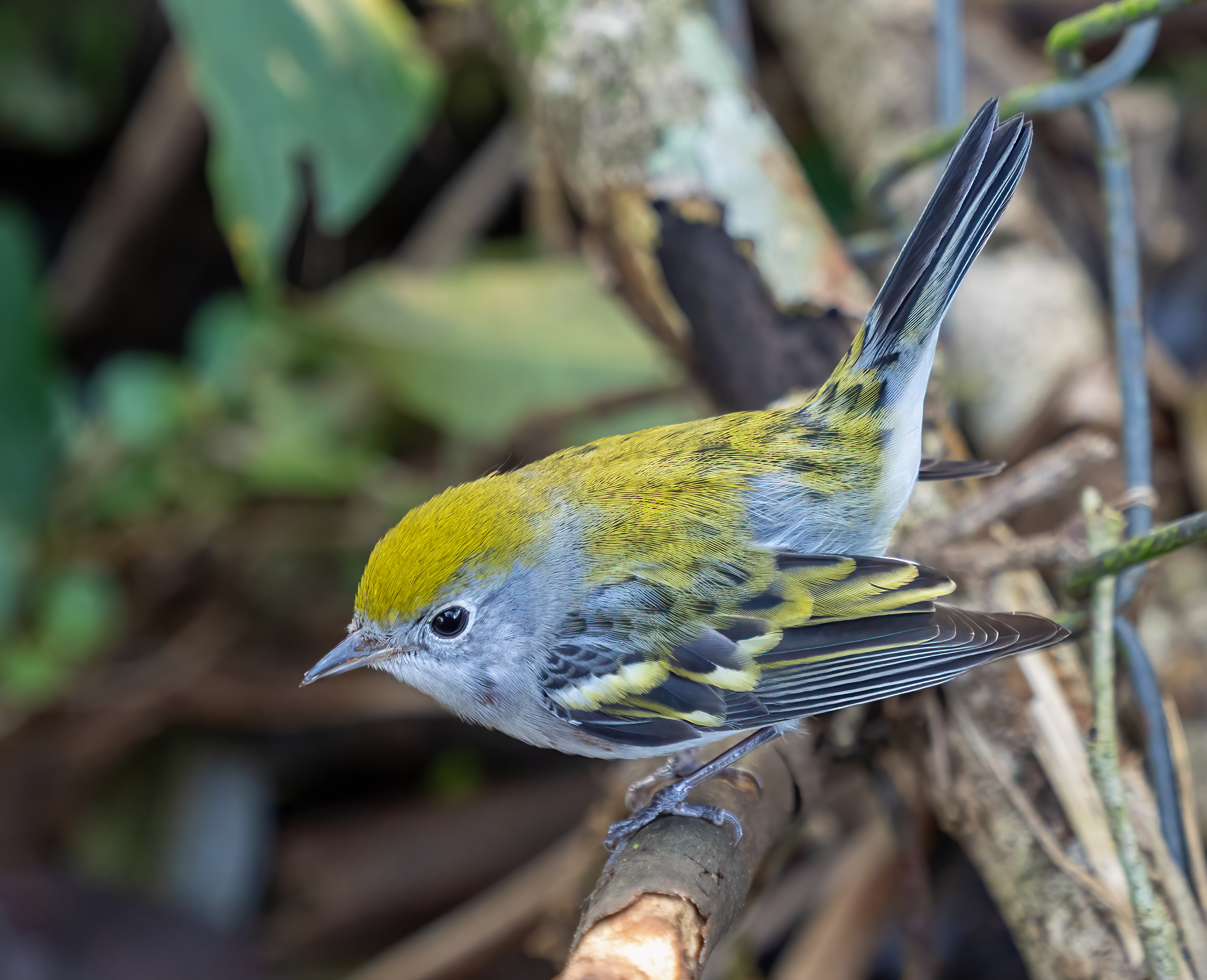
- Nonbreeding plumage (female or immature male)

Conservation status
- Least Concern (IUCN 3.1)

Scientific classification
- Kingdom: Animalia
- Phylum: Chordata
- Class: Aves
- Order: Passeriformes
- Family: Parulidae
- Genus: Setophaga
- Species: S. pensylvanica

Binomial name
- Setophaga pensylvanica (Linnaeus, 1766)
- Breeding range Wintering range

Synonyms
- Motacilla pensylvanica Linnaeus, 1766; Dendroica pensylvanica (Linnaeus, 1766)

= Chestnut-sided warbler =

Species of bird

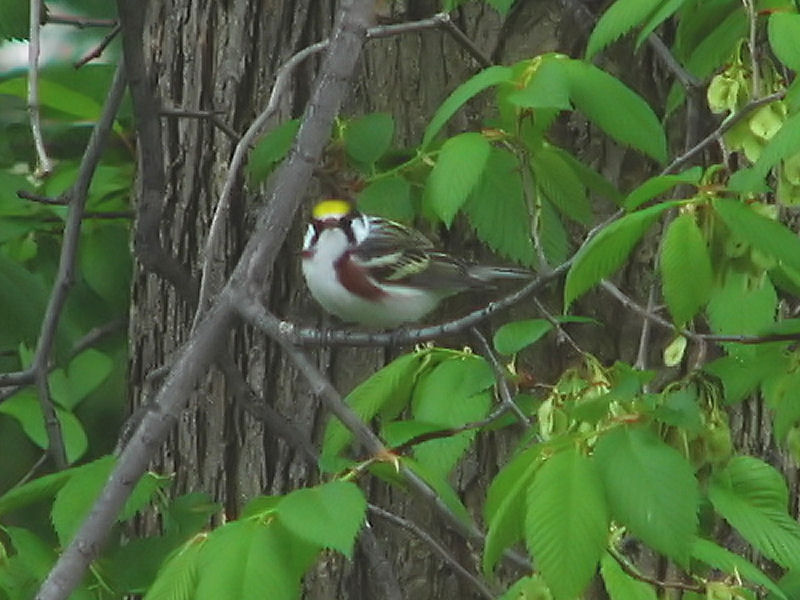
Male, Ottawa, Ontario

The chestnut-sided warbler (Setophaga pensylvanica) is a New World warbler. They breed in eastern North America and in southern Canada westwards to the Canadian Prairies. They also breed in the Great Lakes region and in the eastern United States.

== Taxonomy ==
The chestnut-sided warbler was formally described in 1766 by the Swedish naturalist Carl Linnaeus in the twelfth edition of his Systema Naturae under the binomial name Motacilla pensylvanica. Linnaeus based his account on the "Red-throated fly-catcher" that had been described and illustrated in 1760 by the English naturalist George Edwards in his book Gleanings of Natural History. Edwards had received specimens from the American naturalist William Bartram that had been collected in Pennsylvania. The chestnut-sided warbler is now one of more than 30 species placed in the genus Setophaga that was introduced in 1827 by the English naturalist William Swainson. The genus name Setophaga combines the Ancient Greek σης/sēs, σητος/sētos meaning "moth" with -φαγος/-phagos meaning "-eating". The species is monotypic: no subspecies are recognised.

Setophaga icterocephala is a junior synonym of S. pennsylvanicus, and is no longer used.

The chestnut-sided warbler used to be in the genus Dendroica; however, it was merged with the genus Setophaga in 2011. The change resulted with Setophaga having the most species in the family of New World warblers.

== Description ==
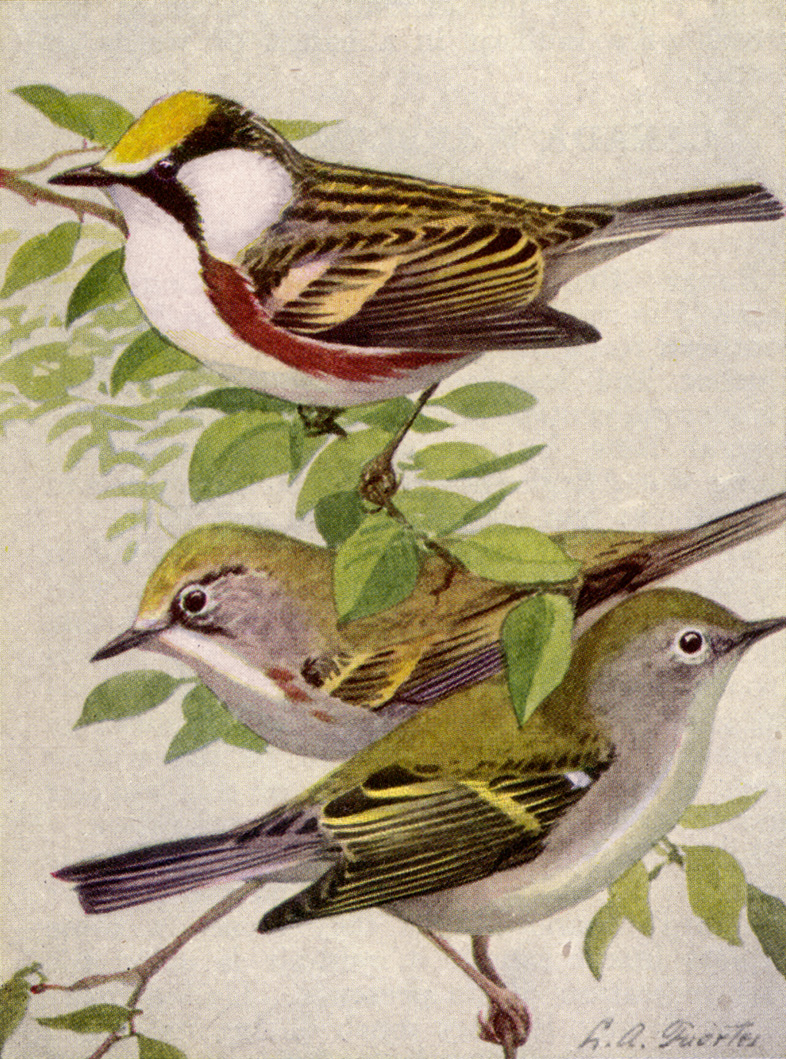
Adult male, summer (top) Young male (center) Adult, winter (below)

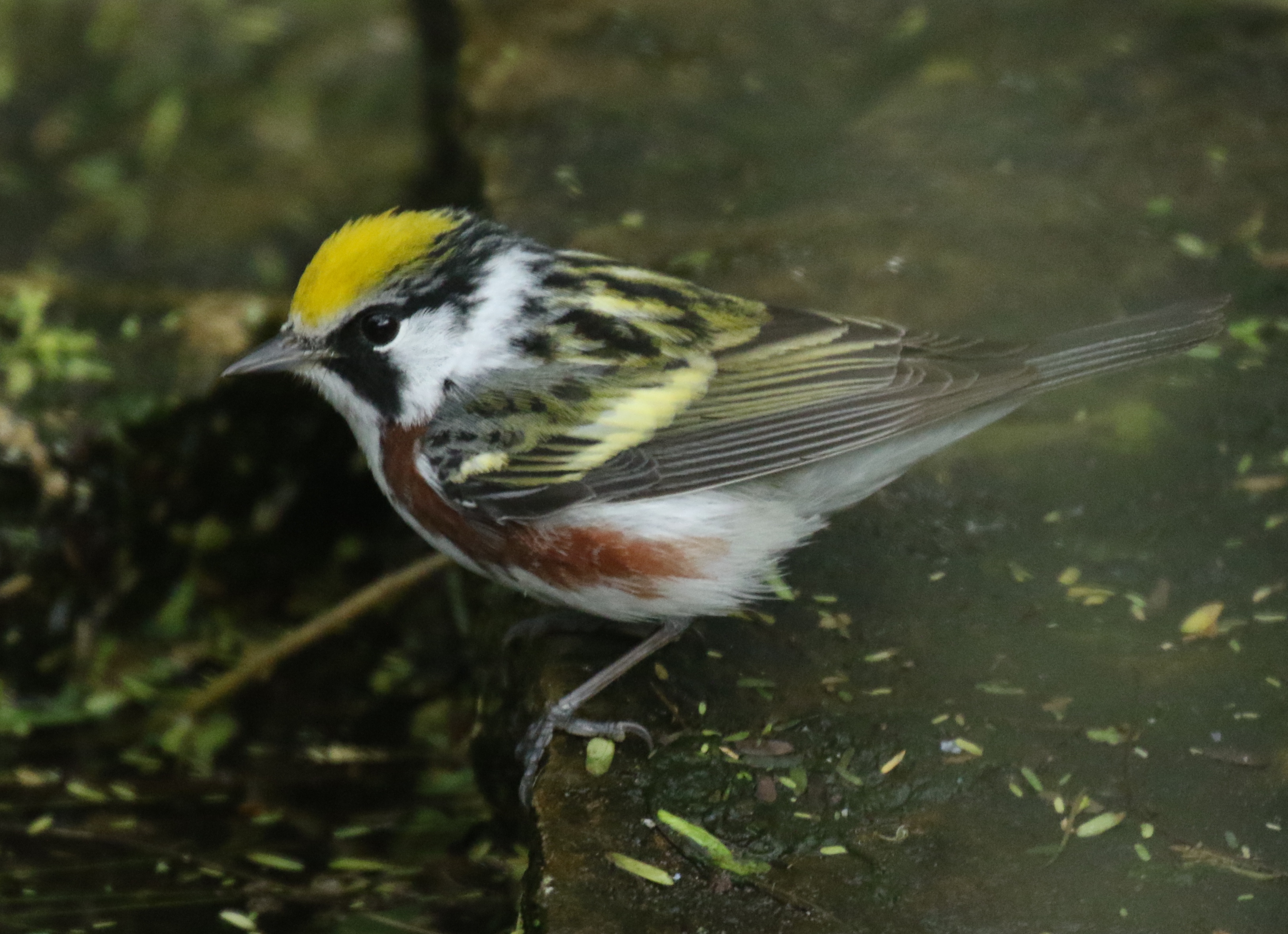
South Padre Island - Texas

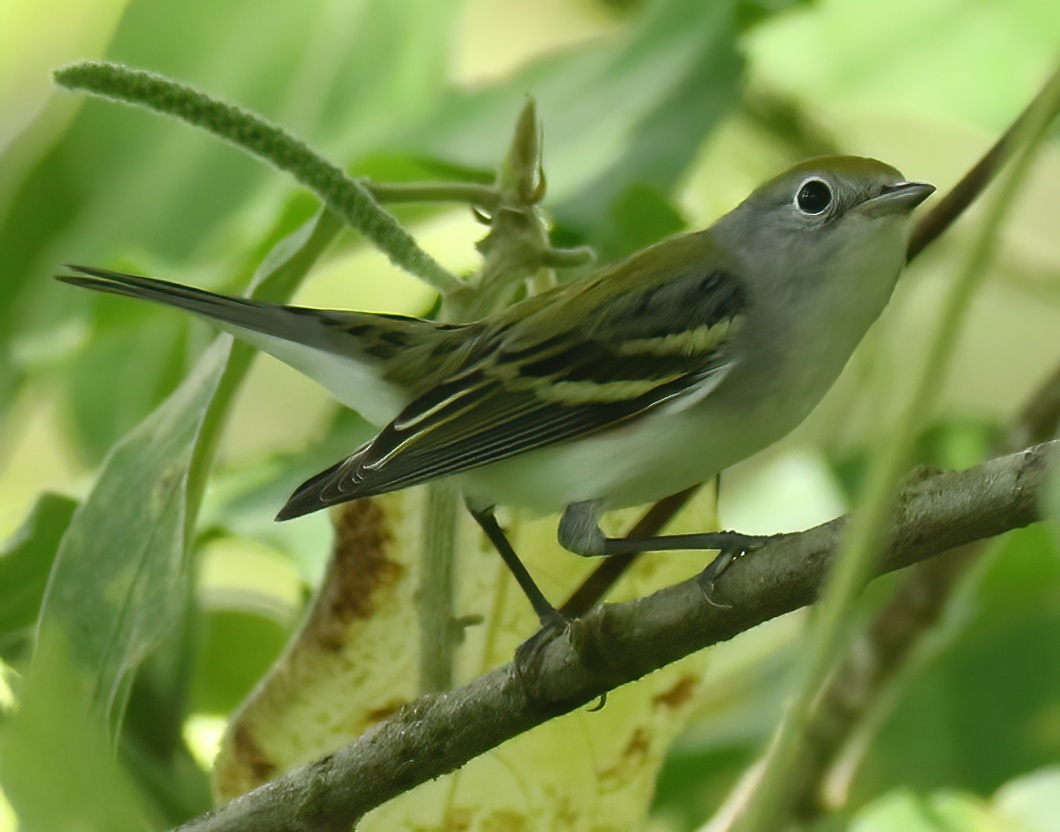
juv m or non breeding f - Selva Verde Lodge, Costa Rica

This species is a moderately-sized New World warbler. Despite having very different plumage, it is thought to be closely related to the widespread yellow warbler. In total, this species measures from 10 to 14 cm (3.9 to 5.5 in) in length and spans 16 to 21 cm (6.3 to 8.3 in) across the wings. Body weight ranges from 8 to 13.1 g (0.28 to 0.46 oz). Among standard measurements, the wing chord is 5.7 to 6.8 cm (2.2 to 2.7 in), the tail is 4.2 to 5.8 cm (1.7 to 2.3 in), the bill is 0.9 to 1 cm (0.35 to 0.39 in) and the tarsus is 1.7 to 1.9 cm (0.67 to 0.75 in).

In the summer, male chestnut-sided warblers are unmistakable in appearance. They display dark-streaked gray backs, white faces, black eyestripes and yellow crowns. Their underparts are white, with chestnut flanks, and they also have two white wing bars. The adult females resemble washed-out versions of the summer male, and in particular, the females lack the strong head pattern, and also have little to no chestnut coloring on their flanks.

Non-breeding birds of both sexes have bright yellow-green crowns, white eye-rings on a grey face, and unstreaked underparts. They also have unstreaked pale grey breasts. Their wing bars are always present in their plumages.

== Distribution and habitat ==
The chestnut-sided warbler breeds in Eastern North America, from Saskatchewan to the Maritimes. Although an observation of a male in breeding plumage was recorded as far West as British Columbia. They are usually found south of the 50°N, with the north-west Georgia as the most southern extent of their breeding range.

They overwinter in Central America to northern Colombia, with a confirmed sighting from as far south as Ecuador. While they mainly spend their non-breeding period in Central America, with the highest numbers in Costa Rica, the chestnut-sided warbler does winter in southern parts of Mexico and some north-western parts of South America.

The chestnut-sided warbler has benefited from the clearing of mature forests in their breeding ranges. They make use of the abundant second growth habitats, forests after clearcuttings and/or fires. Their numbers increase as soon as a year after clear-cuts, peaking seven to eight years after the disturbance.

In the tropics where they winter, the species occurs mostly in mature tropical rainforests where they tend to stick to the mid- to upper- canopy. They are known to use coffee plantations and riparian zones in Costa Rica.

=== Migration ===
These birds are Neotropical migrants, and are very rare vagrants to western Europe. Their breeding season starts in May in North America, and they start their fall migration as early as late August to as late as late September. the chestnut-sided warbler migrates east of the Rocky Mountains, through Bahama, the Greater Antilles and eastern Mexico. The chestnut-sided warbler departs their wintering grounds sometime in April. They tend to stick to migrating through parts of Mexico and east of the Rocky Mountains with few passing by the Caribbean during the spring migration. Males arrive on the breeding grounds a few days to a week before the females.

== Behavior and ecology ==
=== Vocalizations ===
The songs are high whistled lines often described as pleased, pleased, pleased to MEECHA. This accented song is used primarily to attract a female and decrease in frequency once nesting is well under way. Males also sing unaccented songs (without the MEECHA at the end) and these are used mostly in territory defense and aggressive encounters with other males. Some versions of the unaccented songs are not as commonly used in general, but rather reserved for aggressive contexts. While it does guarantee that the bird will attack, it does represent an escalation to an intruder. Some males sing only unaccented songs, and they are less successful at securing mates than males that sing both songs. Their calls are harsh chips. Despite the fact that songs for courtship do not vary across small distances, songs for aggression are highly localized, a possible explanation being that female Chestnut-Sided Warblers disperse over long distances.

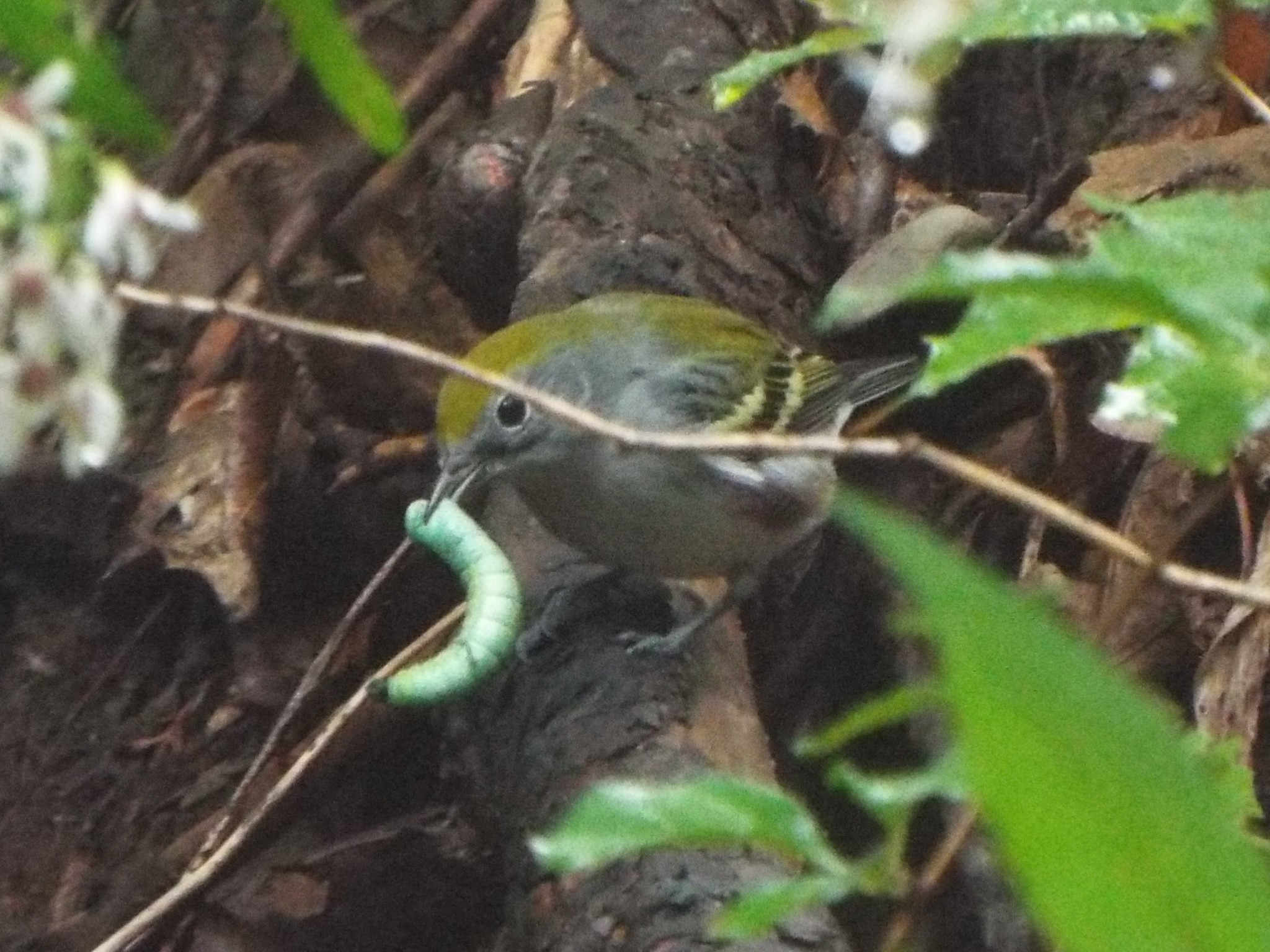
Eating rough prominent caterpillar

=== Food and feeding ===
Chestnut-sided warblers are primarily insectivorous. They feed primarily on lepidopteran and dipteran larvae, and will sometimes eat spiders, seeds, and fruits. They forage actively in shrubs and small trees, and sometimes will attempt to catch insects in mid-air. Most foraging consists of gleaning insects from foliage. They will include berries in their winter diets, such as those of Cymbopetalum mayanum; such trees can be used to attract wintering birds into gardens and parks. Chestnut-sided warblers forage alone.

=== Breeding ===
It is thought that chestnut-sided warblers started reproducing in their first year. Since the males arrive first on the breeding grounds, they will establish their territory. However, it appears that females decide where to build their nest. Their nests are placed in a low bush, which is usually located in young deciduous woodland or scrub. Females build the nest into a small cup woven of bark strips, weed stems, grasses, and plant down. The nest is usually placed in a small crotch of a shrub or vertical tangle of vines no more than 2 m (6.6 ft) above the ground. This species is frequently parasitized by brown-headed cowbirds (Molothrus ater). These birds lay 3–5 eggs that are creamy white or greenish with brown speckles in color. Usually, couples will only have one clutch; however, they might have a second clutch if the first one fails.

Researchers have noted agonistic behavior between male chestnut-sided warblers and golden-winged warblers (Vermivora chrysoptera) during the breeding season in the southern Appalachians. Interestingly, aggressive behavior was not a guarantee if males of both species came across each other.

== Hybridization ==
On May 25, 2014, the Long Point Bird Observatory (Ontario, Canada) recorded a new hybrid: a chestnut-sided warbler hybrid with a magnolia warbler (Setophaga magnolia). The individual was caught in a mist-net at the Long Point's research station Old Cut. Genetic and morphological evidence points to the mother being a chestnut-sided warbler and the father being a magnolia warbler.

A Brewster's warbler with two small brown spots on its throat was documented in Pennsylvania in 2018. Brewster's warblers are a hybrid of golden-winged warbler (Vermivora chrysoptera) and blue-winged warbler (Vermivora cyanoptera). The chestnut spots and its class pointed to the individual having a chestnut-sided warbler parent, making it a three-species hybrid. It was later confirmed through genetic tests that the father was a chestnut-sided warbler, and the mother was a Brewster's warbler. The extremely rare hybrid was named Burket's warbler after the person who first made the observation of the individual.

Billy Weber uploaded his observation of a chestnut-sided warbler and black-throated blue warbler (Setophaga caerulescens) hybrid to ebird in 2019. The hybrid, located in Pennsylvania, visually looked like a male black-throated blue warbler with brown sides.

The chestnut-sided warbler might have hybridized on two other accounts. the Handbook on Avian Hybrids of the World highlights a black-and-white warbler (Mniotilta varia) hybrid and a blackburnian warbler (Setophaga fusca) hybrid who might have had a chestnut-sided warbler parent. However, other species were also suggested to have contributed to creating the hybrids, and no genetic tests were performed to confirm one way or another.

Song
Chestnut-sided warbler singing at Bear Head Lake State Park in Minnesota

== Population ==
This bird's numbers have increased as second growth forest became more common in the east in the late 19th century; their numbers have declined slightly since then. The Breeding Bird Survey BBS in New England has shown an overall decrease in population from 1966 to 2015, but an increase in Pennsylvania. Local population trends are most likely tied to habitat changes.
