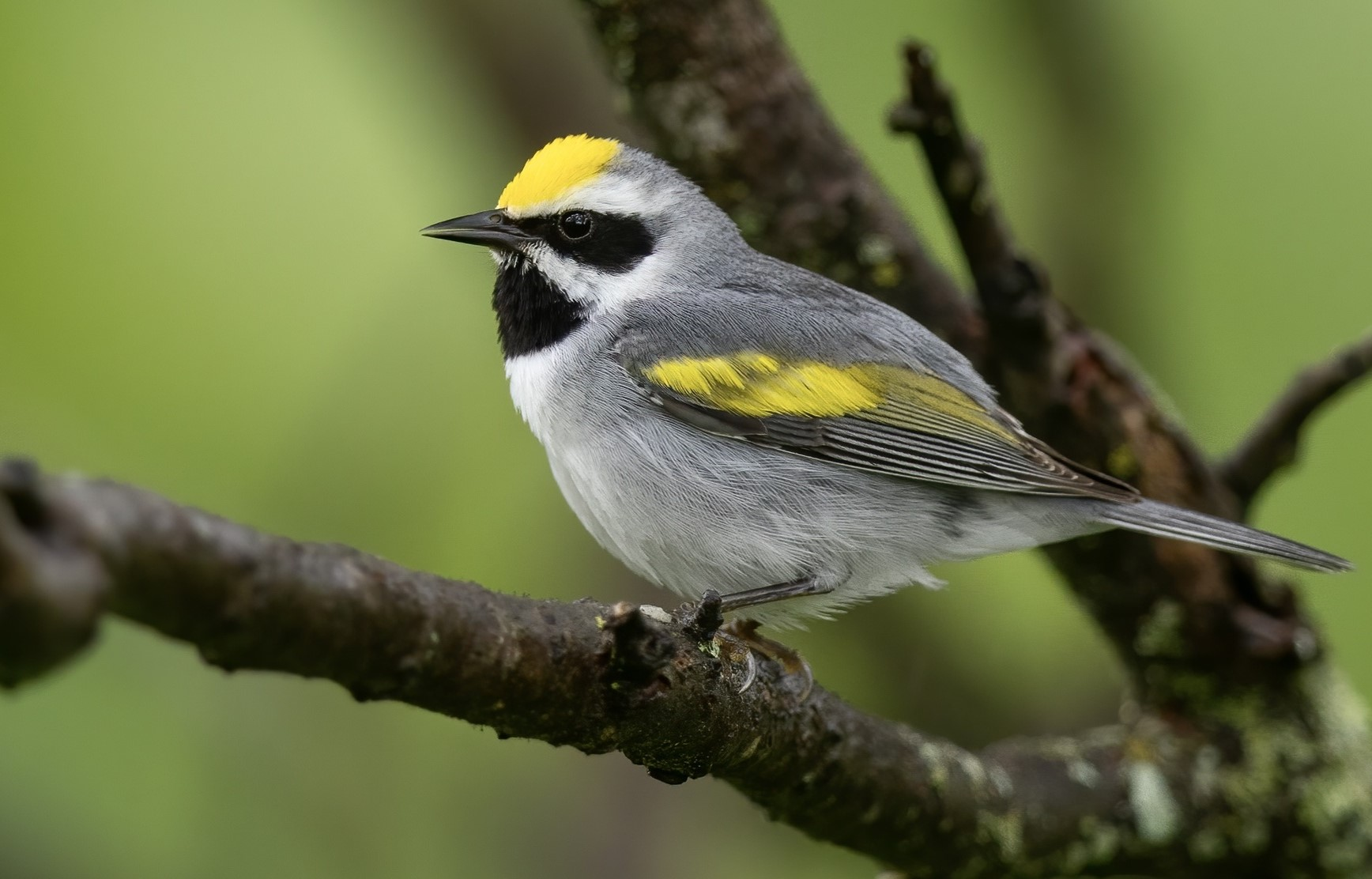
- Male
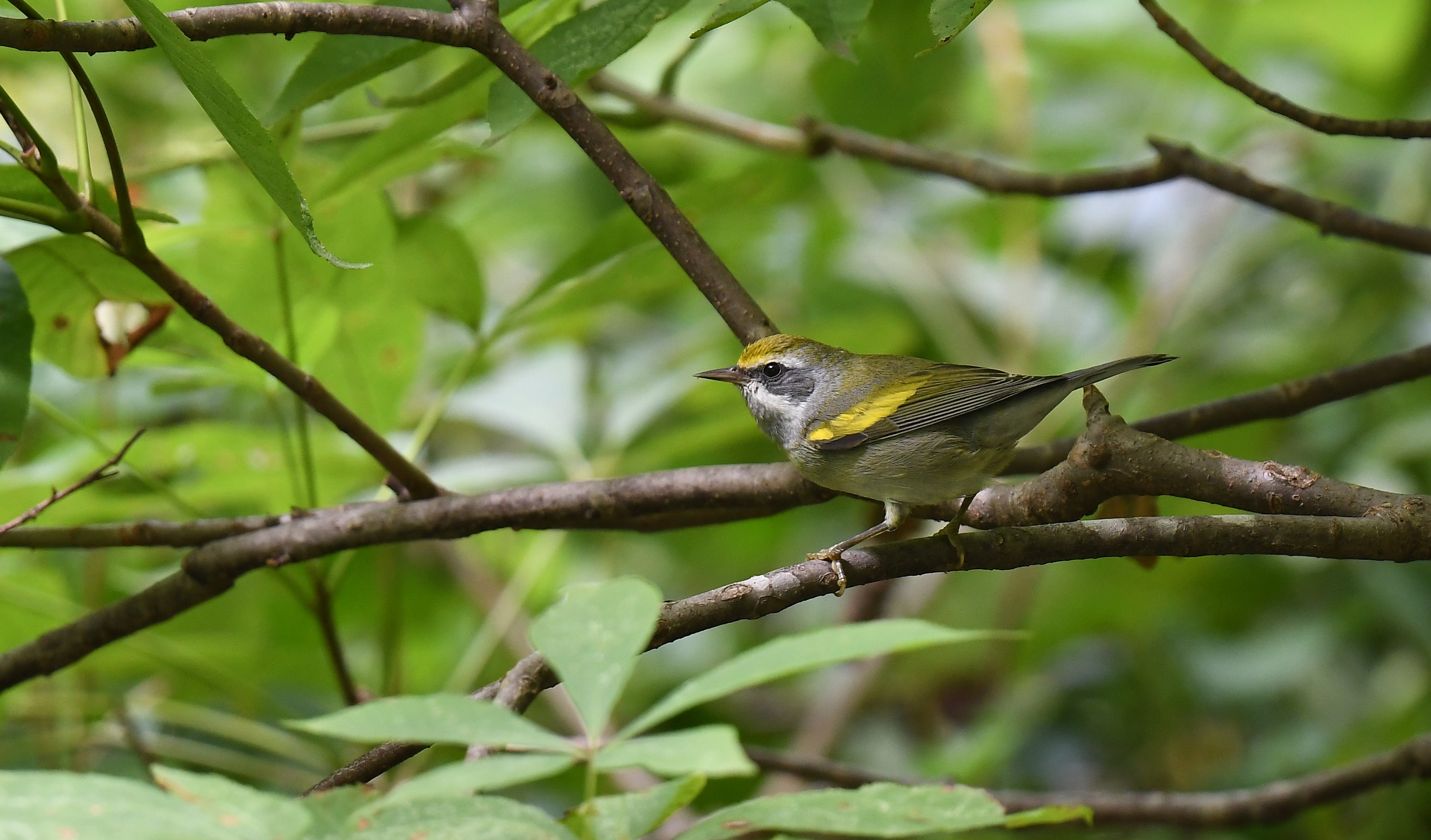
- Female

Conservation status
- Near Threatened (IUCN 3.1)

Scientific classification
- Kingdom: Animalia
- Phylum: Chordata
- Class: Aves
- Order: Passeriformes
- Family: Parulidae
- Genus: Vermivora
- Species: V. chrysoptera

Binomial name
- Vermivora chrysoptera (Linnaeus, 1766)
- Range of V. chrysoptera (note: missing distribution in the Caribbean) Breeding range Wintering range

Synonyms
- Motacilla chrysoptera Linnaeus, 1766; Helminthophila chrysoptera (Linnaeus, 1766)

= Golden-winged warbler =

Species of bird

The golden-winged warbler (Vermivora chrysoptera) is a small migratory insectivorous bird in the New World warbler family Parulidae. It breeds in southeastern and south-central Canada and in the Appalachian Mountains in the northeastern to north-central United States. The majority (~70%) of the global population breeds in Wisconsin, Minnesota, and Manitoba. Golden-winged warbler populations are slowly expanding northwards but are generally declining across its range. This is most likely as a result of habitat loss and competition/interbreeding with the very closely related blue-winged warbler, Vermivora cyanoptera, albeit the latter point has been debated. Populations are now restricted to two regions: the Great Lakes and the Appalachian Mountains.

== Taxonomy ==
The golden-winged warbler was formally described in 1766 by the Swedish naturalist Carl Linnaeus in the twelfth edition of his Systema Naturae under the binomial name Motacilla chrysoptera. The specific epithet is from Ancient Greek χρυσοπτερος/khrusopteros meaning "golden-winged", from χρυσος/khrusos meaning "gold" and -πτερος/-pteros meaning "-winged". Linnaeus based his entry on "The golden-winged fly-catcher" that had been described and illustrated in 1760 by the English naturalist George Edwards in his book Gleanings of Natural History. Edwards had received a specimen from the American naturalist William Bartram that had been collected in Pennsylvania. The type location was restricted to near Philadelphia by the American Ornithologists' Union in 1910. The golden-winged warbler is now placed in the genus Vermivora that was introduced in 1827 by the English zoologist William Swainson. The genus name combines Latin vermis meaning "worm" with -vorus meaning "-eating". The species is monotypic, with no subspecies accepted.

== Description ==
The golden-winged warbler is a small songbird, typically measuring 11.6 cm (4.6 in) long, weighing 8–10 g (0.28–0.35 oz), and having a wingspan of about 20 cm. The male has a black throat and a black mask bordered in white. Females resemble males but have a light gray throat and mask. Both sexes display a yellow crown, a yellow patch on the wing, and extensive white on the tail, which is conspicuous from below. The grayish white underparts contrast the darker gray back, and the bill is long and slender. Juvenile individuals appear similar to females, regardless of sex.

Their song is variable, but is most often perceived as a trilled bzzzzzzz buzz buzz buzz. Their call is a buzzy chip or zip.

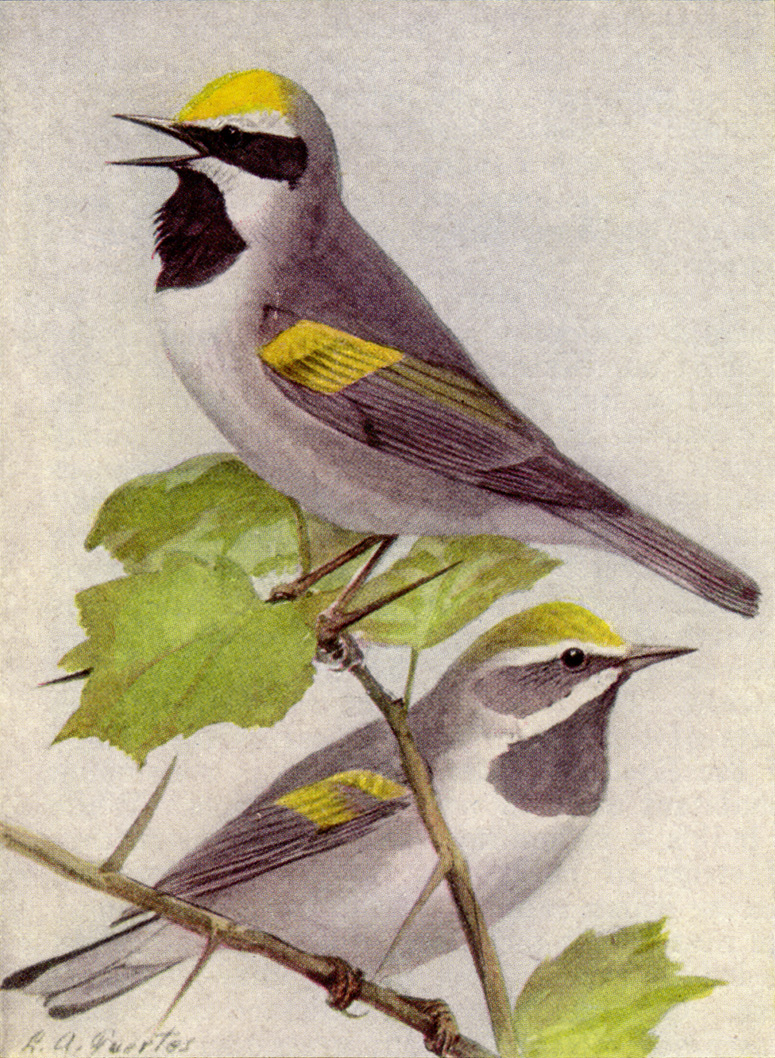
An illustration of adult golden-winged warblers – male (above) and female (below).

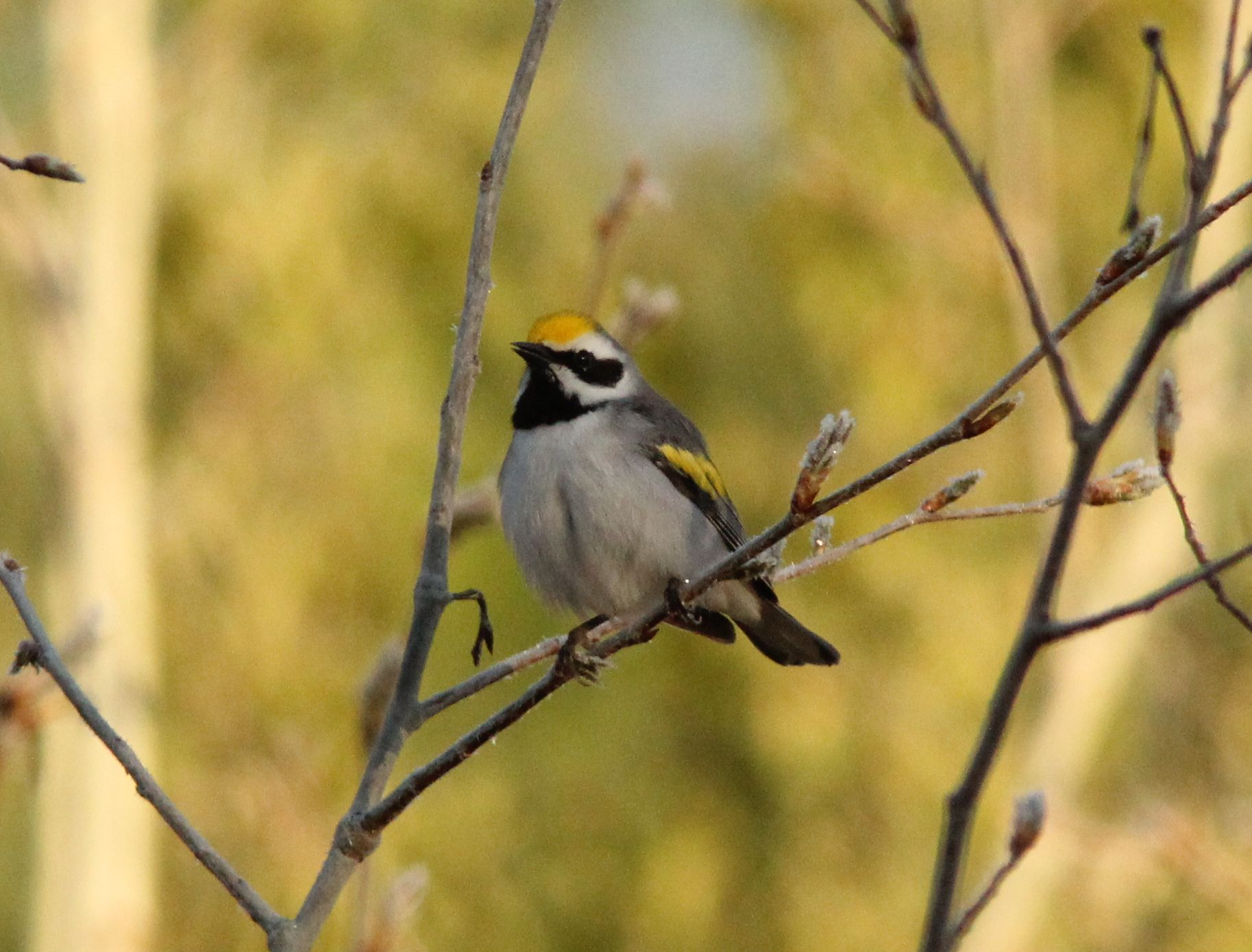
Male

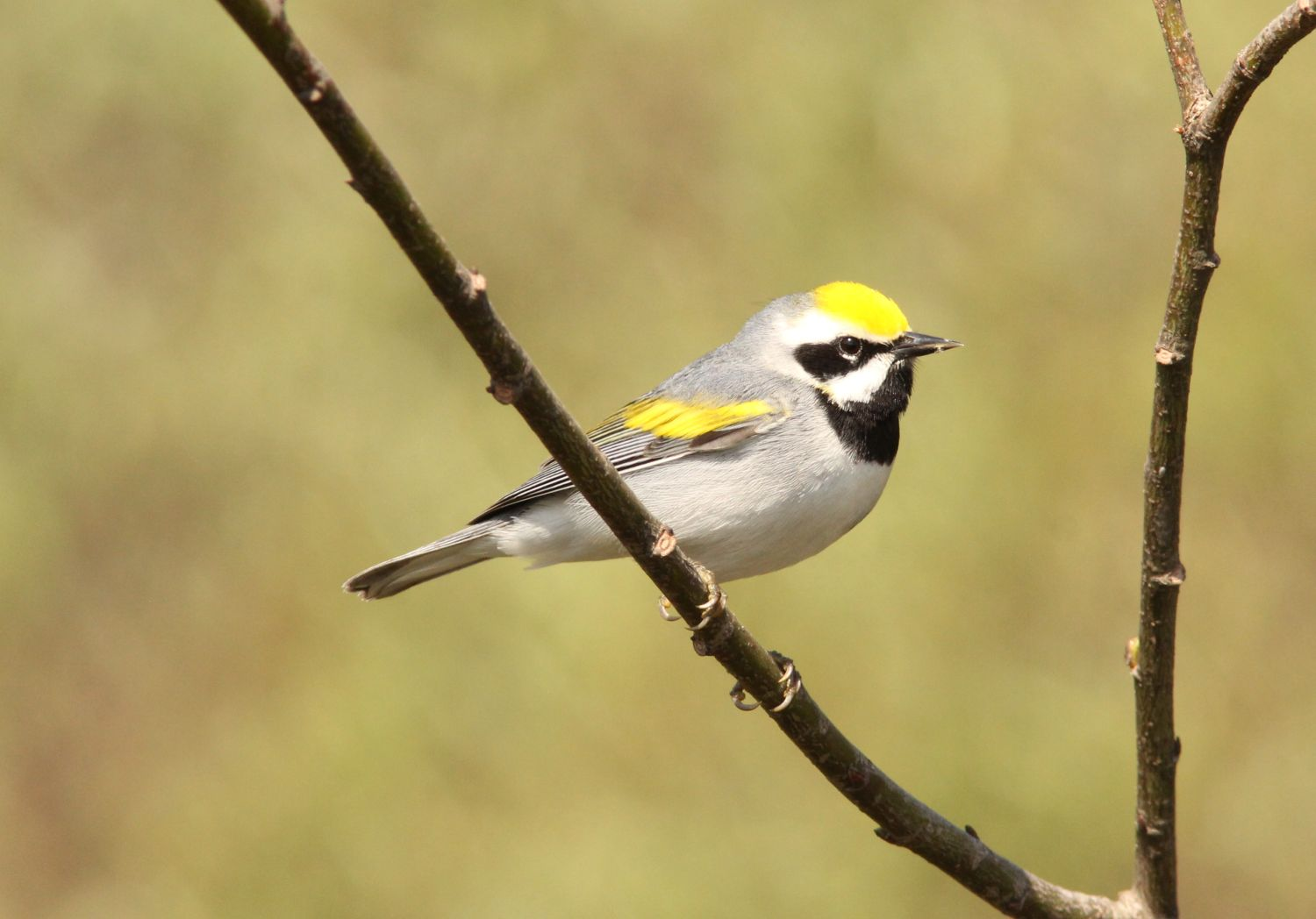
Male

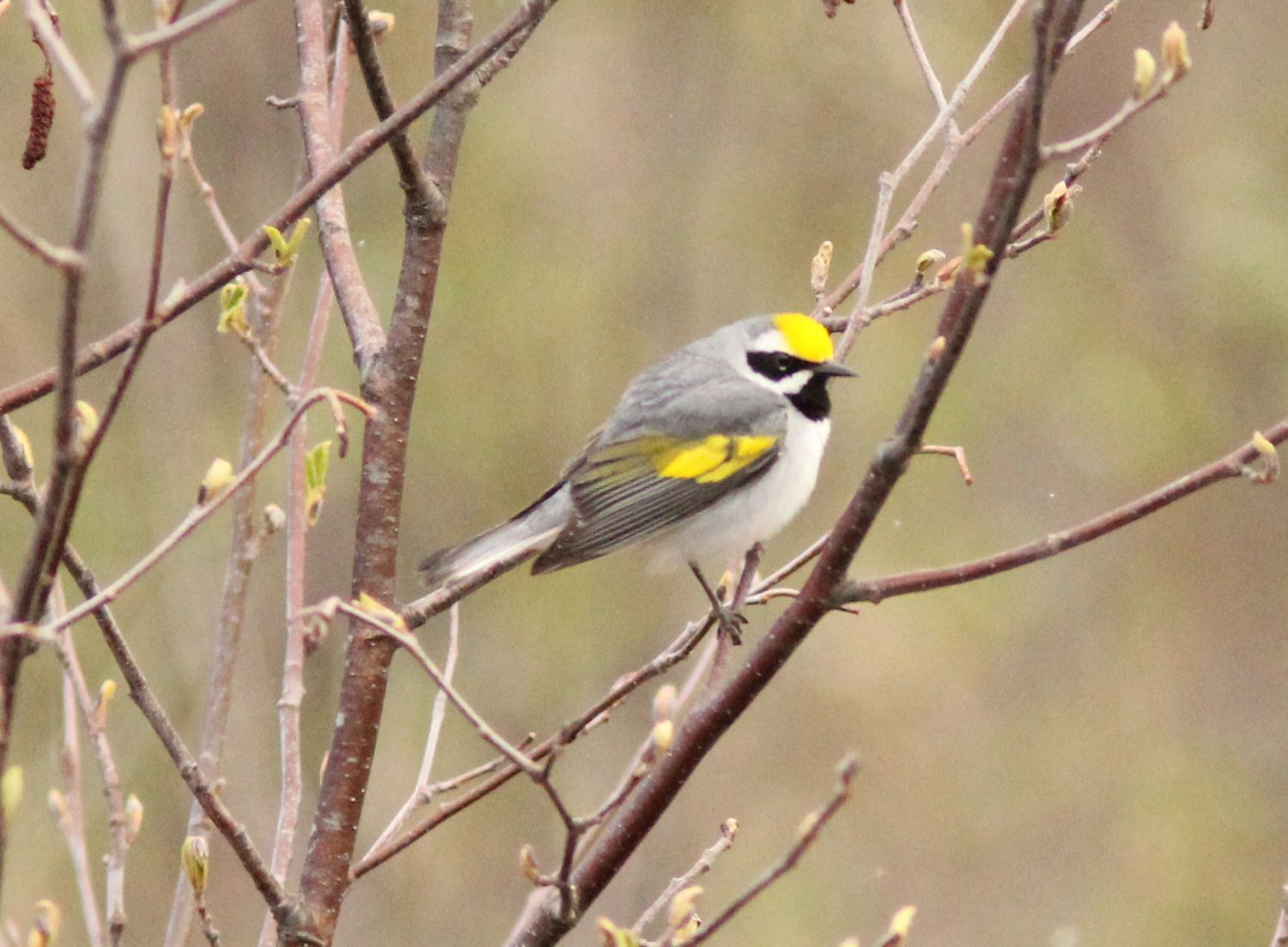
Male

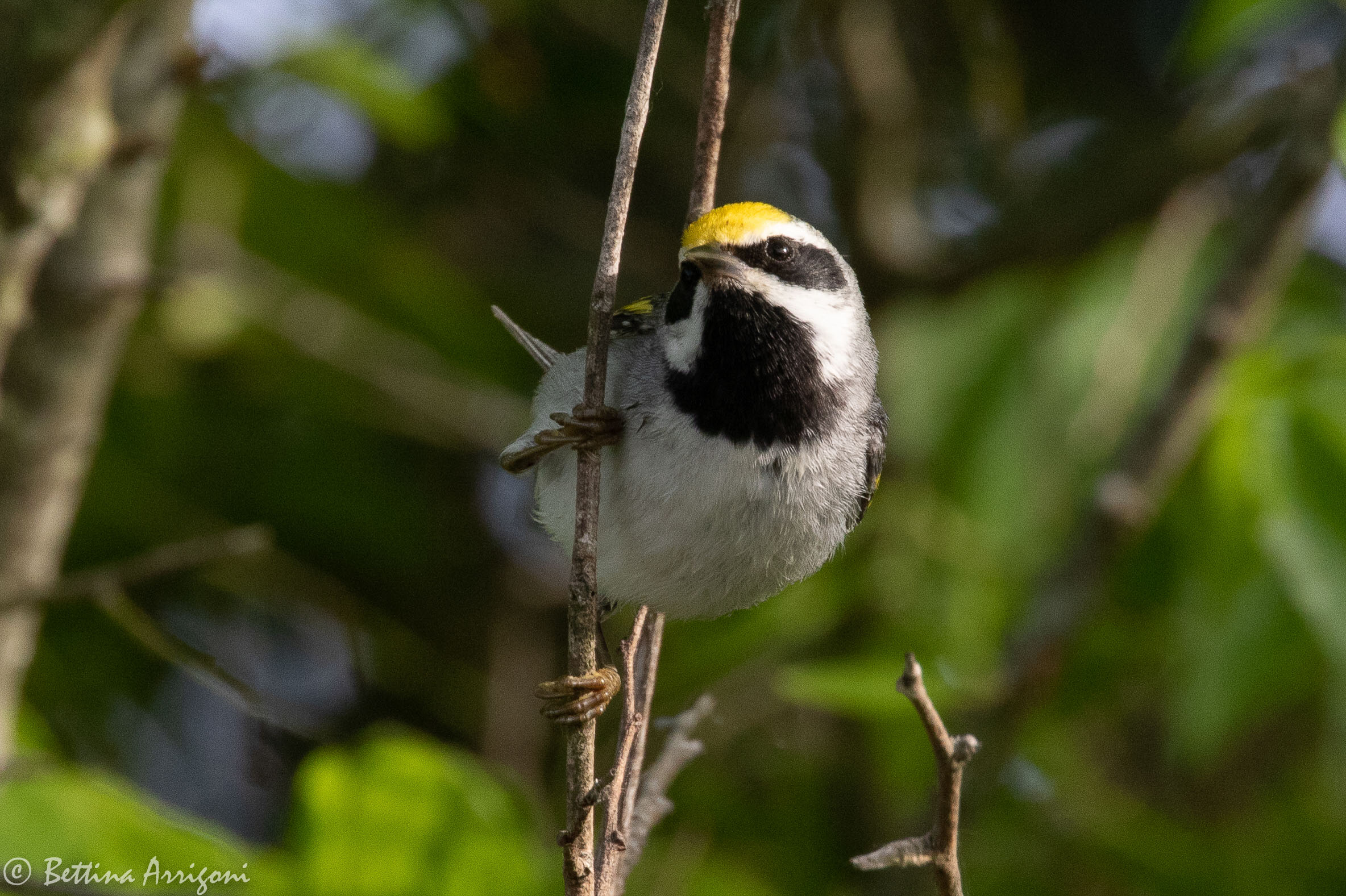
Front Male

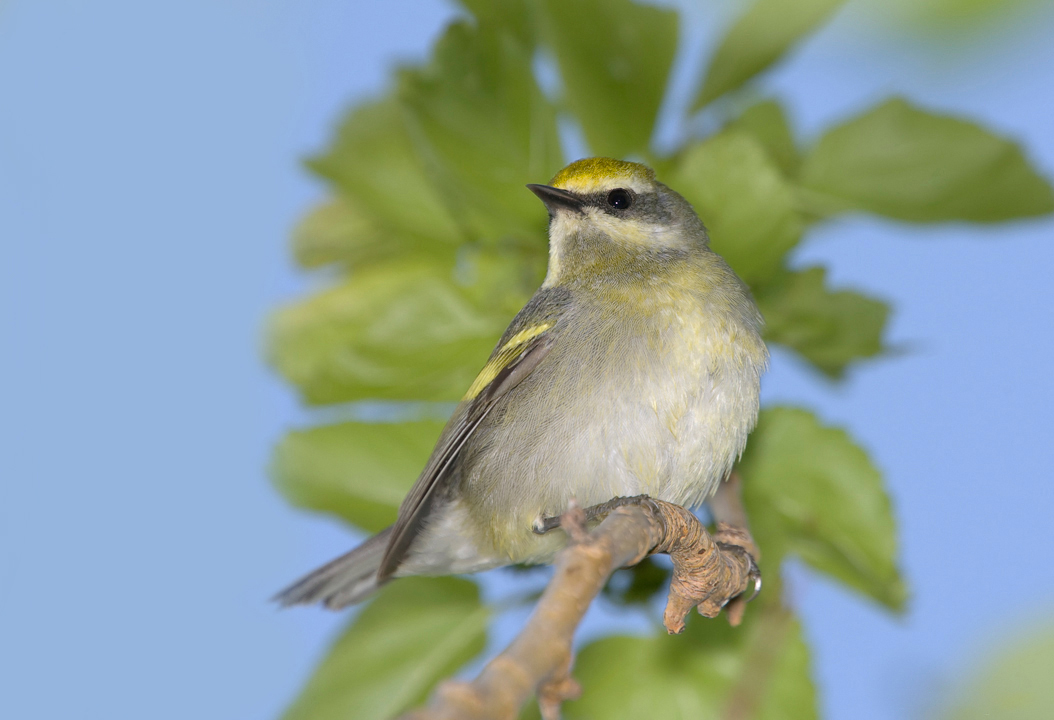
Female

== Distribution and habitat ==
Golden-winged warblers are migratory. There are two populations of golden-winged warblers, one which breeds in the Appalachian and Northeast, and another that breeds around the Great Lakes. Birds from the Appalachian population tend to migrate to South America to winter, while birds from the Great Lakes population tend to migrate to Central America and Mexico. A study has found that the difference in wintering location is linked to a genetic difference in the Z chromosome. They are also encountered rarely as vagrants outside of their native range.

Golden-winged warblers are neotropical-nearctic migrants, and their habitat selectivity varies seasonally. Golden-winged warblers wintering in Costa Rica select premontane evergreen forest rather than tropical dry forest plant communities. Golden-winged warblers forage in hanging dead leaves, which are often a result of intermediate disturbances to the forest plant community.

During the breeding season, golden-winged warblers nest in shrubland and regenerating forest communities created and maintained by disturbance. This dependency on early-successional plant communities is part of the reason golden-winged warbler populations are declining.

Five geotracked golden-winged warblers in Tennessee were observed migrating hundreds of miles south, presumably avoiding tornadic storms, in April 2014. Individuals left prior to the arrival of the storm, perhaps after detecting it using infrasound.

== Behavior and ecology ==
=== Breeding ===
Golden-winged warblers breed in open scrubby areas and wetlands, as well as mature forest adjacent to those habitats. They lay 3–6 eggs (often 5) in a concealed cup nest on the ground or low in a bush. Incubation of eggs, from laying to hatch, lasts 11–12 days.

Nestlings are fed almost entirely on caterpillars (especially leafrollers) delivered by their parents. Adult diets are less thoroughly described, but it is assumed they subsist heavily on caterpillars, and occasionally spiders. They have strong gaping (opening) musculature around their bill, allowing them to uncover hidden caterpillars.

Male golden-winged warblers use their brilliant yellow crowns, black throats, and white tail feather patches to signal habitat quality. Birds with showier ornaments protect higher quality territories and are typically less aggressive than their less brilliantly-colored conspecifics. However, ornamentation has not been shown to be linked with overall reproductive success. This is likely because golden-winged warblers with less ornamentation likely compensate with increased aggression.

Nests are frequently parasitized by brown-headed cowbirds; up to 30% of golden-winged warbler nests may be parasitized in habitats they share with cowbirds.

== Hybridization ==
This species will readily hybridize with blue-winged warblers where their ranges overlap in the Great Lakes and New England area. The two species' genomes are 99.97% alike and only differ strongly in six regions. A particular region of differentiation at the promoter region of the Agouti-signaling protein (ASIP) is responsible for controlling throat colour following Mendelian inheritance; birds with one or more copies of the dominant allele of this gene lack a black throat like the blue-winged warbler, while homozygous recessive birds have a black throat like the golden-winged warbler. As a result of such, two distinct hybrid forms result from first-generation mating between species.

The more common ASIP-heterozygous Brewster's warbler is gray above and whitish (male) or yellow (female) below. It has a black eyestripe and two pale yellow wing bars.

The rarer ASIP-homozygous recessive Lawrence's warbler has a male plumage that is greenish-yellow above and yellow below, with white wing bars. The female is gray above and whitish below, with two white wing bars. Because the hybrid is recessive for the ASIP gene, both sexes display golden-winged warbler facial patterns (black/gray mask and throat) of the respective sex.

Brewster's and Lawrence's warblers can vary considerably in their physical features, and sing songs of either blue-winged or golden-winged warblers. The colour of the throat patch reliably correlates with hybrid type, but colour of the underparts is highly variable between different hybrids.

An exceptionally rare triple hybrid, named Burket's warbler, was described in Pennsylvania in 2018 by researchers at Cornell University's Lab of Ornithology. The Burket's warbler was determined through genetic testing to be the offspring of a Brewster's warbler and another closely related species, the chestnut-sided warbler. The only known Burket's warbler sang a chestnut-sided warbler's song.

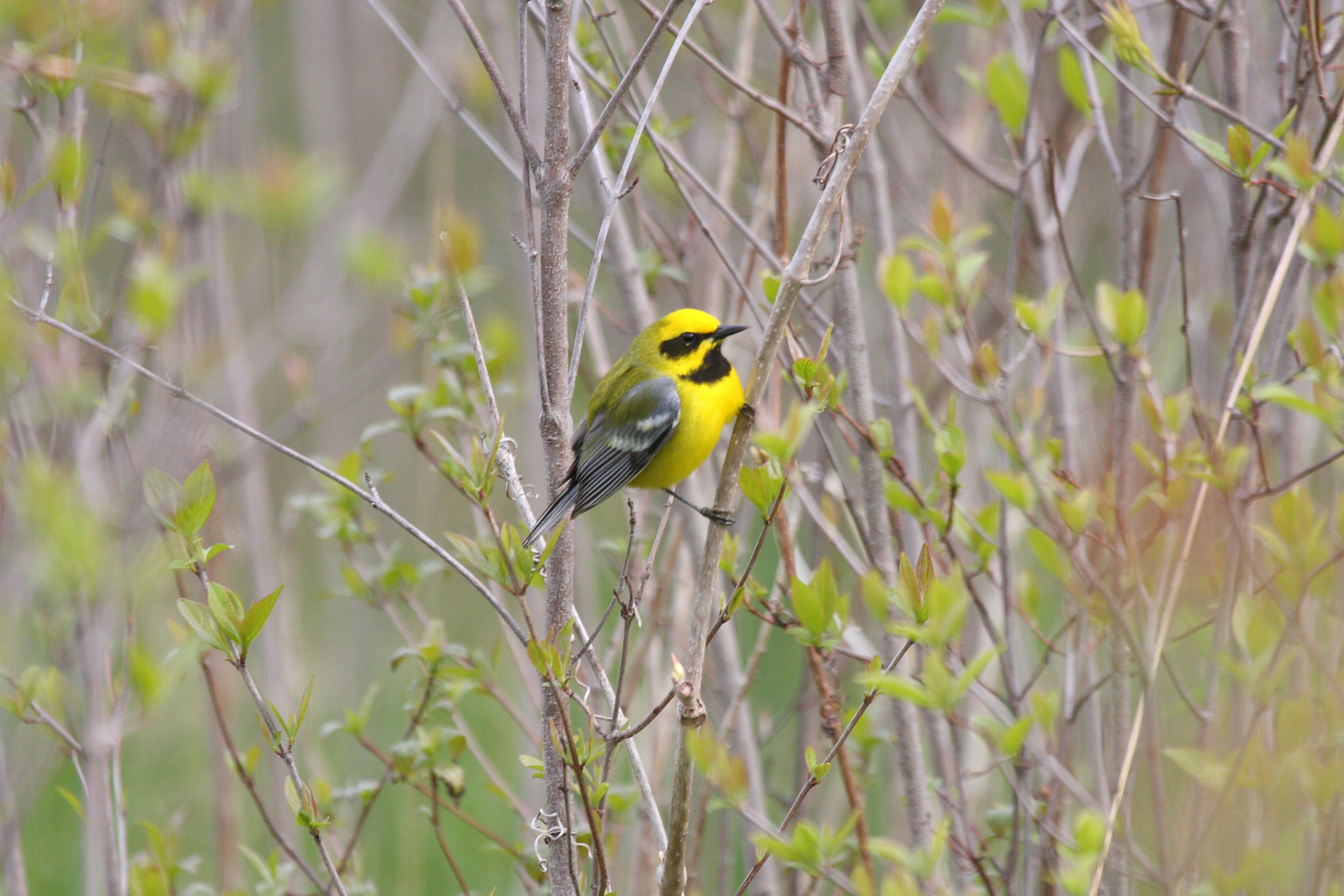
Lawrence's Warbler

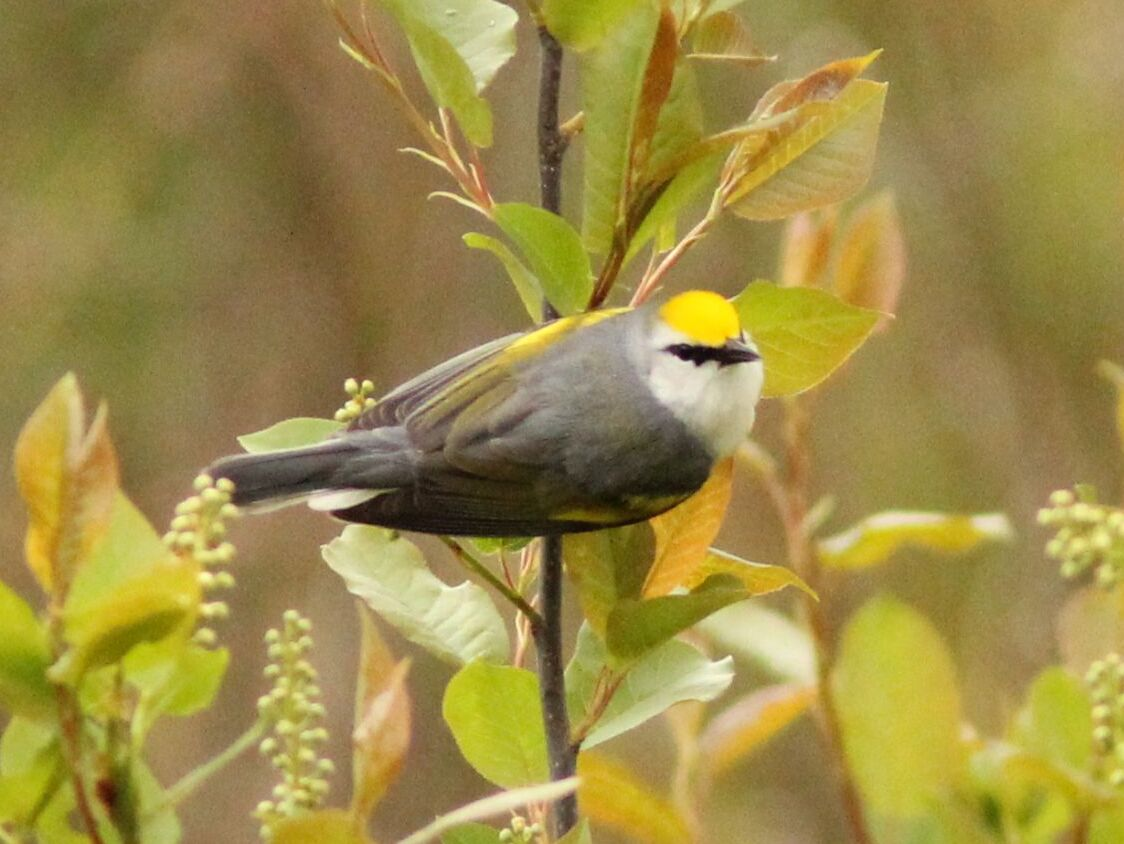
Brewster's Warbler

Introgression occurs across their range, producing cryptic hybrids (near-morphologically pure individuals with small amounts of blue-winged warbler DNA). These hybrids may be present in low numbers even on the edges of golden-winged warbler range, far from any populations of blue-winged warblers.

The rate of hybridization between golden-winged warblers and blue-winged warblers is likely much higher than initially thought. Genetic analysis has allowed scientists to more accurately quantify extra-pair copulation (EPC). One study showed that EPC accounted for 30% of nestlings and occurred in 55% of golden-winged warbler nests, indicating an individual's observed pair-bond partner was not necessarily the genetic parent of their offspring. Additionally, hybrid warblers were found to have breeding success comparable to "pure" golden-winged warblers. These findings suggest that estimating hybridization rate based solely on pair bonds underrepresents the true extent of hybridization, as EPC outside of pair bonds has a substantial likelihood of producing hybrid offspring.

Hybridization with blue-winged warblers is widely considered a threat to the golden-winged warbler population, as it was originally thought that the two species were previously geographically isolated and made contact in the 1800s–early 1900s due to anthropogenic change. This basis was largely established following physical observation of specimens and early mtDNA studies, which suggested blue-winged warbler females pioneered hybridization after first contact. However, additional studies have shown that the mtDNA from either species may introgress fairly symmetrically into the other. Analysis of whole-genome data revealed the extreme genetic similarity between the two species and allowed researchers to estimate the duration of hybridization. It is now estimated that while anthropogenic change allowed some additional gene flow in the 19th century, hybridization has been occurring for thousands of years. Following these discoveries, it has been proposed that hybridization poses less of a threat to the conservation of the golden-winged warbler than previously believed.

== Other interspecific interactions ==
In 2015, scientists observed a female golden-winged warbler abandoning her two chicks 5 and 9 days after fledging. The two chicks were subsequently "adopted" by a male black-and-white warbler, which fed the fledglings for 23 days until they reached independence.

== Conservation status ==
The Appalachian population has declined 98% since the 1960s and is significantly imperiled. The U.S. Fish and Wildlife Service has been petitioned to list the species under the Endangered Species Act of 1973 and is currently reviewing all information after issuing a positive finding. Upon review, the U.S. Fish and Wildlife Service found that the petition to list the species as endangered or threatened presents "substantial scientific or commercial information indicating that listing the golden-winged warbler may be warranted". The golden-winged warbler is classed as "Near Threatened" in the International Union for Conservation of Nature's (IUCN) Red List of Threatened Species that is maintained by Birdlife International.
