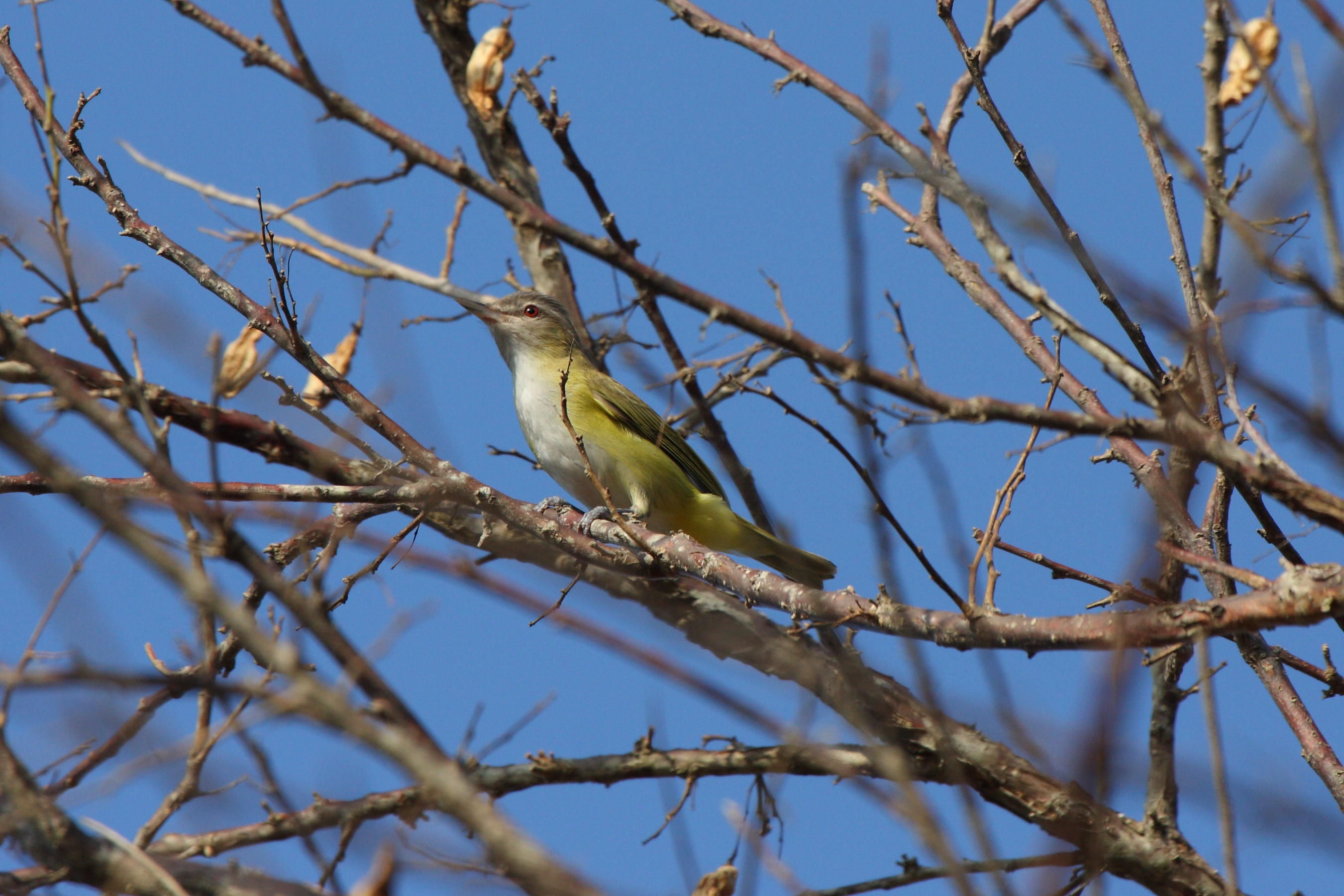
- In Panama

Conservation status
- Least Concern (IUCN 3.1)

Scientific classification
- Kingdom: Animalia
- Phylum: Chordata
- Class: Aves
- Order: Passeriformes
- Family: Vireonidae
- Genus: Vireo
- Species: V. flavoviridis

Binomial name
- Vireo flavoviridis (Cassin, 1851)
- Range Summer breeding range Winter non-breeding range

Synonyms
- Vireo olivaceus flavoviridis Vireosylvia flavoviridis (protonym)

= Yellow-green vireo =

Species of bird

The yellow-green vireo (Vireo flavoviridis) is a small American passerine bird. It is migratory breeding from Mexico to Panama and wintering in the northern and eastern Andes and the western Amazon Basin.

== Taxonomy ==
The yellow-green vireo was formally described by the American ornithologist John Cassin in 1851 under the binomial name Vireosylvia flavoviridis. The specific epithet combines the Latin flavus meaning "yellow" and viridis meaning "green". The type locality is San Juan de Nicaragua. The yellow-green vireo is now placed in the genus Vireo that was introduced in 1808 by the French ornithologist Louis Pierre Vieillot.

Four subspecies are recognised:

- V. f. hypoleucus Van Rossem & Hachisuka, 1937 – northwest Mexico (southeast Sonora to south Sinaloa)
- V. f. flavoviridis (Cassin, 1851) – central north, northeast Mexico to Panama
- V. f. forreri Madarász, G, 1885 – Islas Marías (off west Mexico)
- V. f. insulanus Bangs, 1902 – Pearl Islands (Gulf of Panama)

== Description ==
The adult yellow-green vireo is 14–14.7 cm (5.5–5.8 in) in length and weighs 18.5 g (0.65 oz). It has olive-green upperparts and a dusky-edged gray crown. There is a dark line from the bill to the red-brown eyes, and a white supercilium. The underparts are white with yellow breast sides and flanks. Young birds are duller with brown eyes, a brown tint to the back, and less yellow on the underparts. The adult yellow-green vireo differs from the red-eyed vireo in its much yellower underparts, lack of a black border to the duller gray crown, yellower upperparts and different eye color.

Some individuals are difficult to separate, even in the hand, from the similar red-eyed vireo, with which it is sometimes considered conspecific. Its exact status as a passage bird in countries such as Venezuela is therefore uncertain.

The yellow-green vireo has a nasal nyaaah call, and the song is a repetitive veree veer viree, fee'er vireo viree, shorter and faster than that of the red-eyed vireo. This species rarely sings on its wintering grounds.

== Distribution and habitat ==
It breeds from southern Texas (occasionally the Rio Grande Valley) in the United States and the western and eastern mountain ranges of northern Mexico (the Sierra Madre Occidental and Sierra Madre Oriental—also the Cordillera Neovolcanica) south to central Panama. It is migratory, wintering in the northern and eastern Andes and the western Amazon basin. This vireo occurs in the canopy and middle levels of light woodland, the edges of forest, and gardens at altitudes from sea level to 1,500 m (4,920 ft).

== Behaviour and ecology ==
=== Breeding ===
The 6.5 cm (2.6 in)-wide cup nest is built by the female from a wide range of plant materials, and attached to a stout twig normally 1.5–3.5 m (4 ft 11 in – 11 ft 6 in) above the ground in a tree, but occasionally up to 12 m (39 ft) high. The normal clutch is two or three brown-marked white eggs laid from March to June and incubated by the female alone, although the male helps to feed the chicks. The breeding birds return to Central America from early February to March, and most depart southwards by mid-October.

=== Feeding ===
Yellow-green vireos feed on insects gleaned from tree foliage, favoring caterpillars and beetles. They also eat small fruits, including mistletoe berries, and, in winter quarters, those of Cymbopetalum mayanum (Annonaceae) and gumbo-limbo (Bursera simaruba).

== Gallery ==
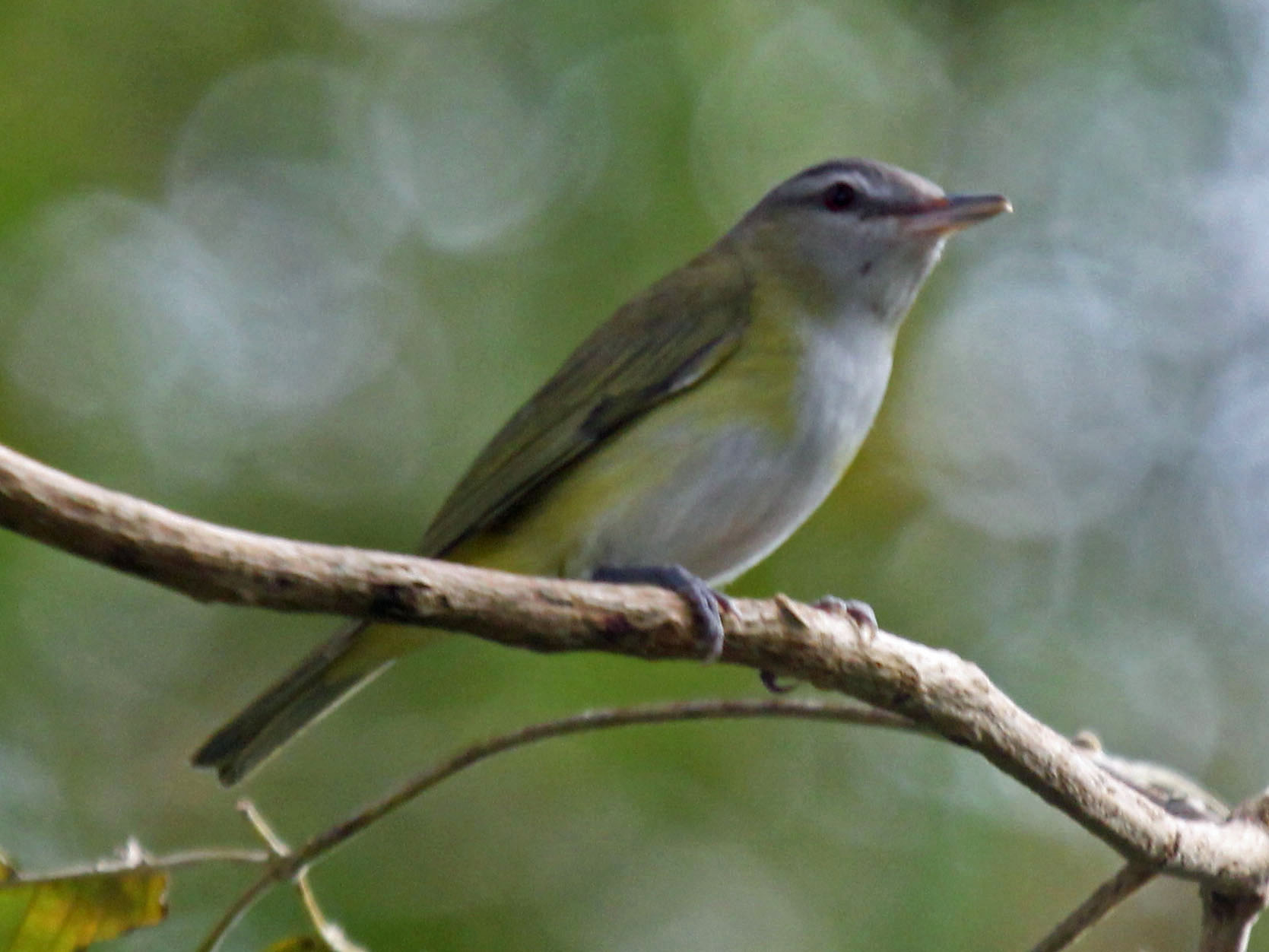
Panama
