= List of birds of San Andrés and Providencia =

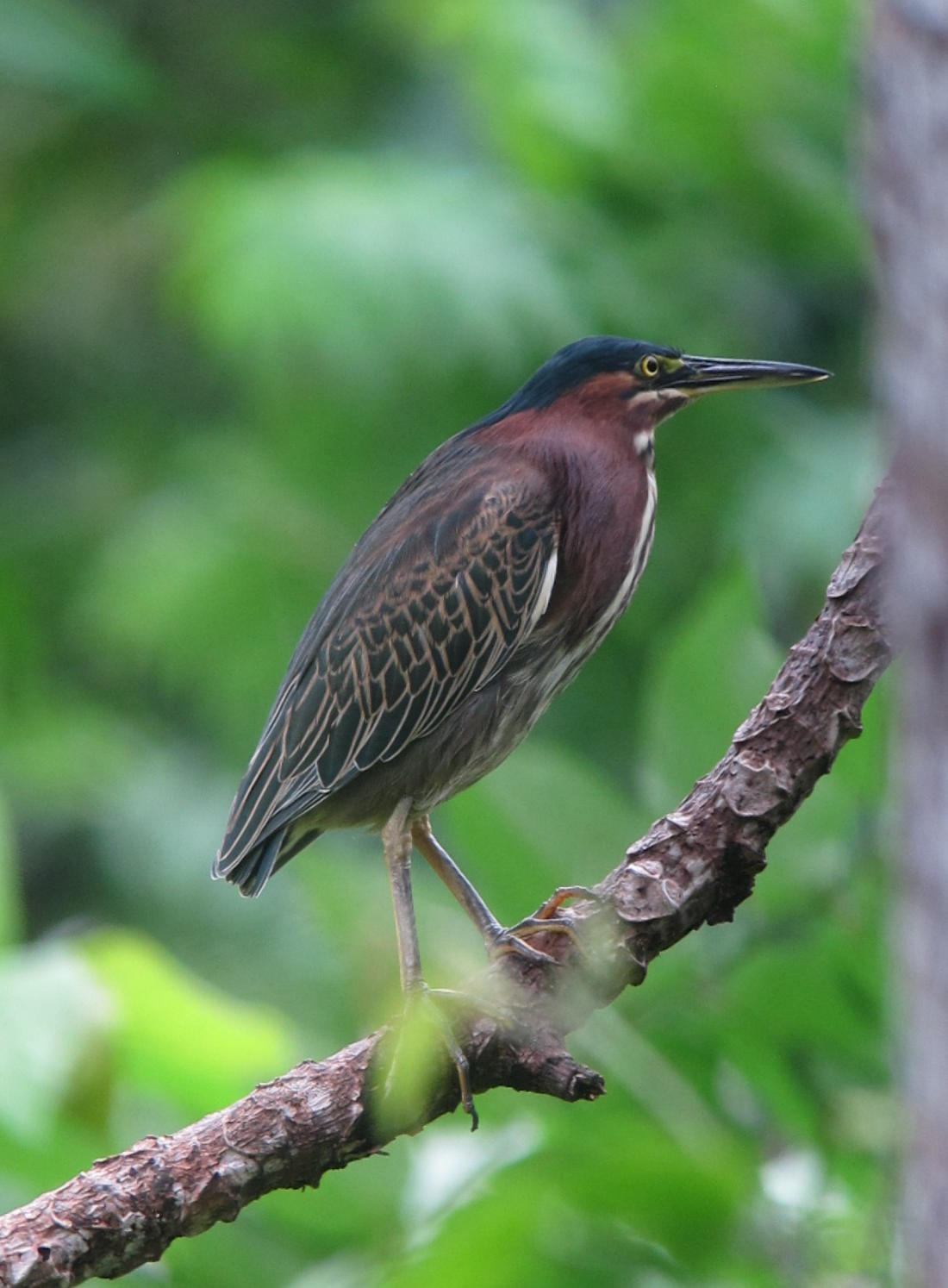
Green heron

This list of birds of San Andrés and Providencia includes species documented in the Colombian department of Archipelago of San Andrés, Providencia and Santa Catalina, commonly referred to as San Andrés and Providencia. The backbone of this list is provided by Avibase, and all additions that differ from this list have citations. As of November 2024, there are 220 recorded bird species in the department.

The following tags note species in each of those categories:

- (A) Accidental - species not regularly occurring in San Andrés and Providencia
- (En) Endemic - species that is only found in San Andrés and Providencia
- (I) Introduced - species that is not native to San Andrés and Providencia

== Ducks, geese, and waterfowl ==
Order: Anseriformes Family: Anatidae

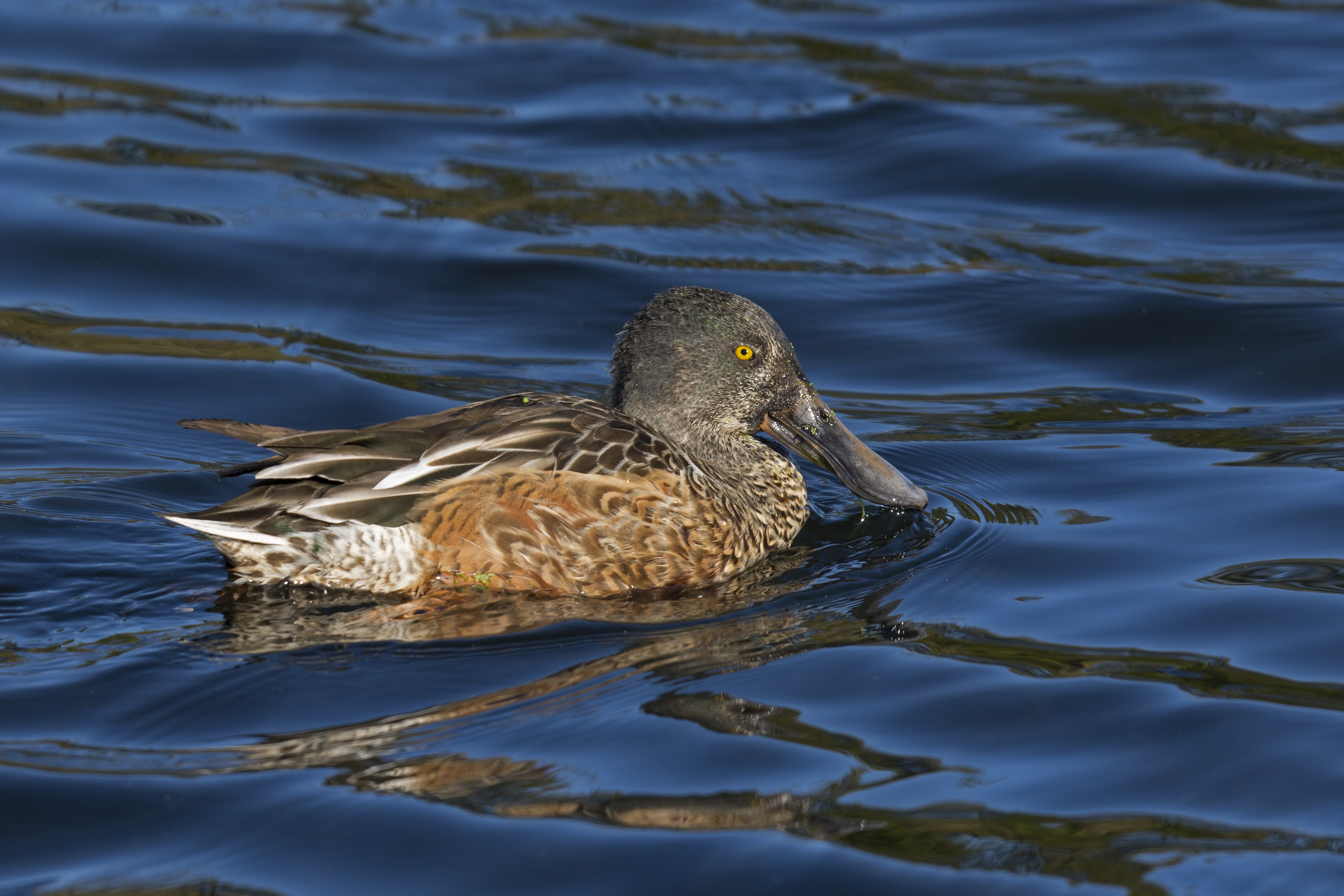
Northern shoveler

- Blue-winged teal (Spatula discors)
- Northern shoveler (Spatula clypeata)
- Gadwall (Mareca strepera) (A)
- American wigeon (Mareca americana)
- Green-winged teal (Anas carolinensis)
- Ring-necked duck (Aythya collaris)
- Lesser scaup (Aythya affinis)
- Red-breasted merganser (Mergus serrator) (A)
- Ruddy duck (Oxyura jamaicensis) (A)

== Doves and pigeons ==
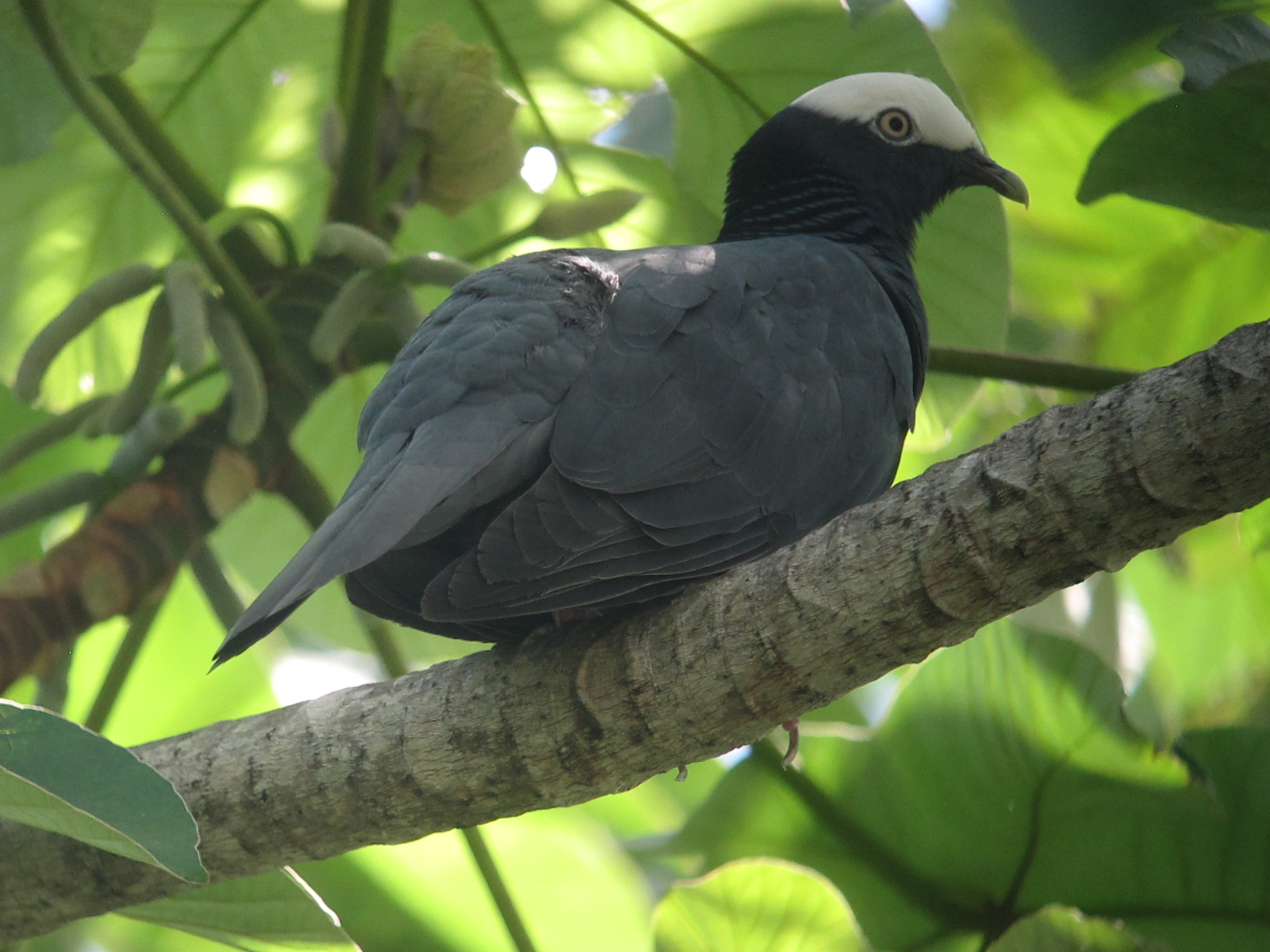
White-crowned pigeon

Order: Columbiformes Family: Columbidae

- Rock dove (Columba livia) (I)
- White-crowned pigeon (Patagioenas leucocephala)
- Common ground dove (Columbina passerina)
- Caribbean dove (Leptotila jamaicensis)
- Mourning dove (Zenaida macroura) (A)
- White-winged dove (Zenaida asiatica)

== Nightjars ==
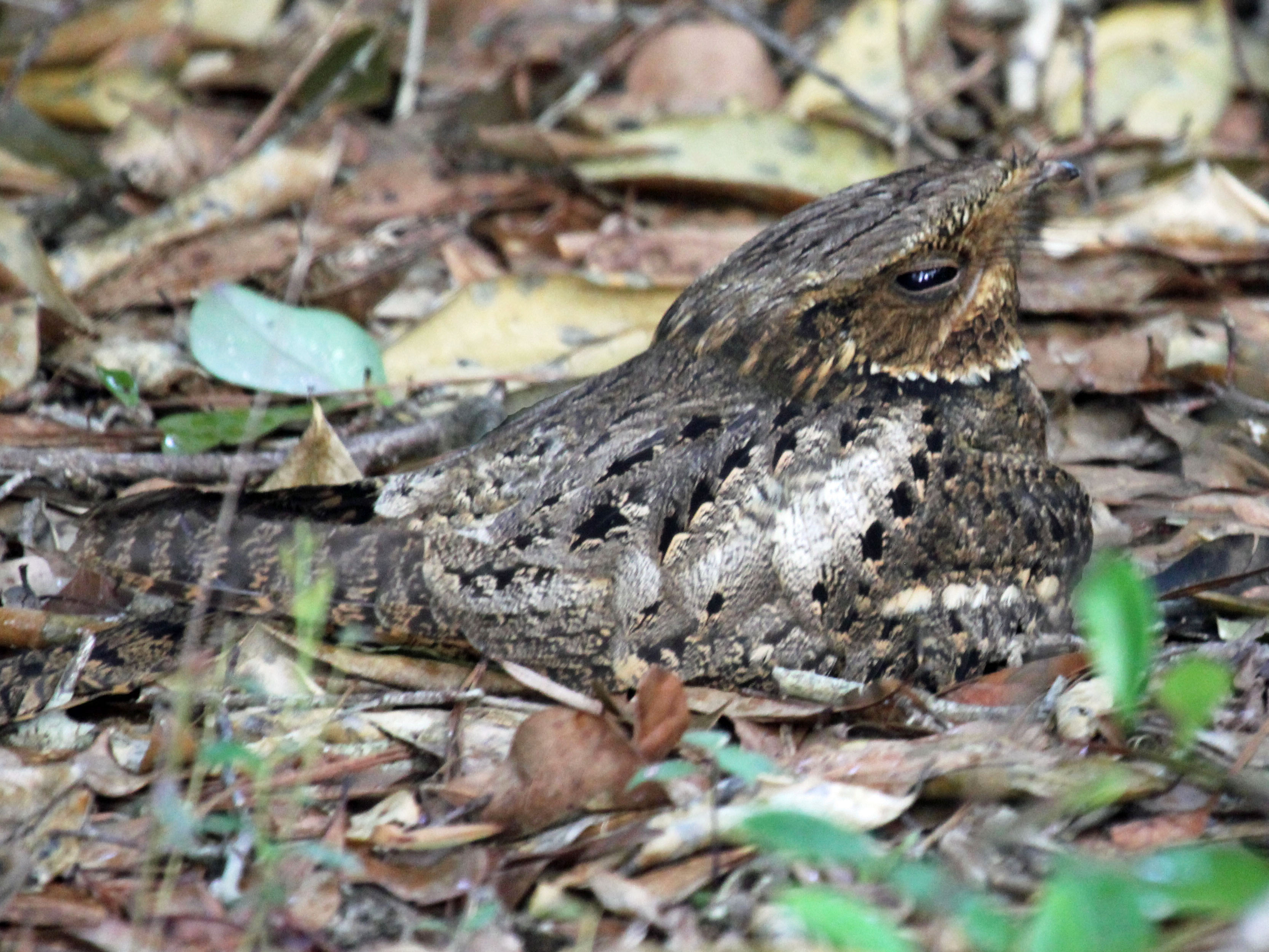
Chuck-will's-widow

Order: Caprimulgiformes Family: Caprimulgidae

- Lesser nighthawk (Chordeiles acutipennis) (A)
- Common nighthawk (Chordeiles minor)
- Antillean nighthawk (Chordeiles gundlachii) (A)
- Chuck-will's-widow (Antrostomus carolinensis)

== Swifts ==
Order: Apodiformes Family: Apodidae

- Chimney swift (Chaetura pelagica)

== Hummingbirds ==
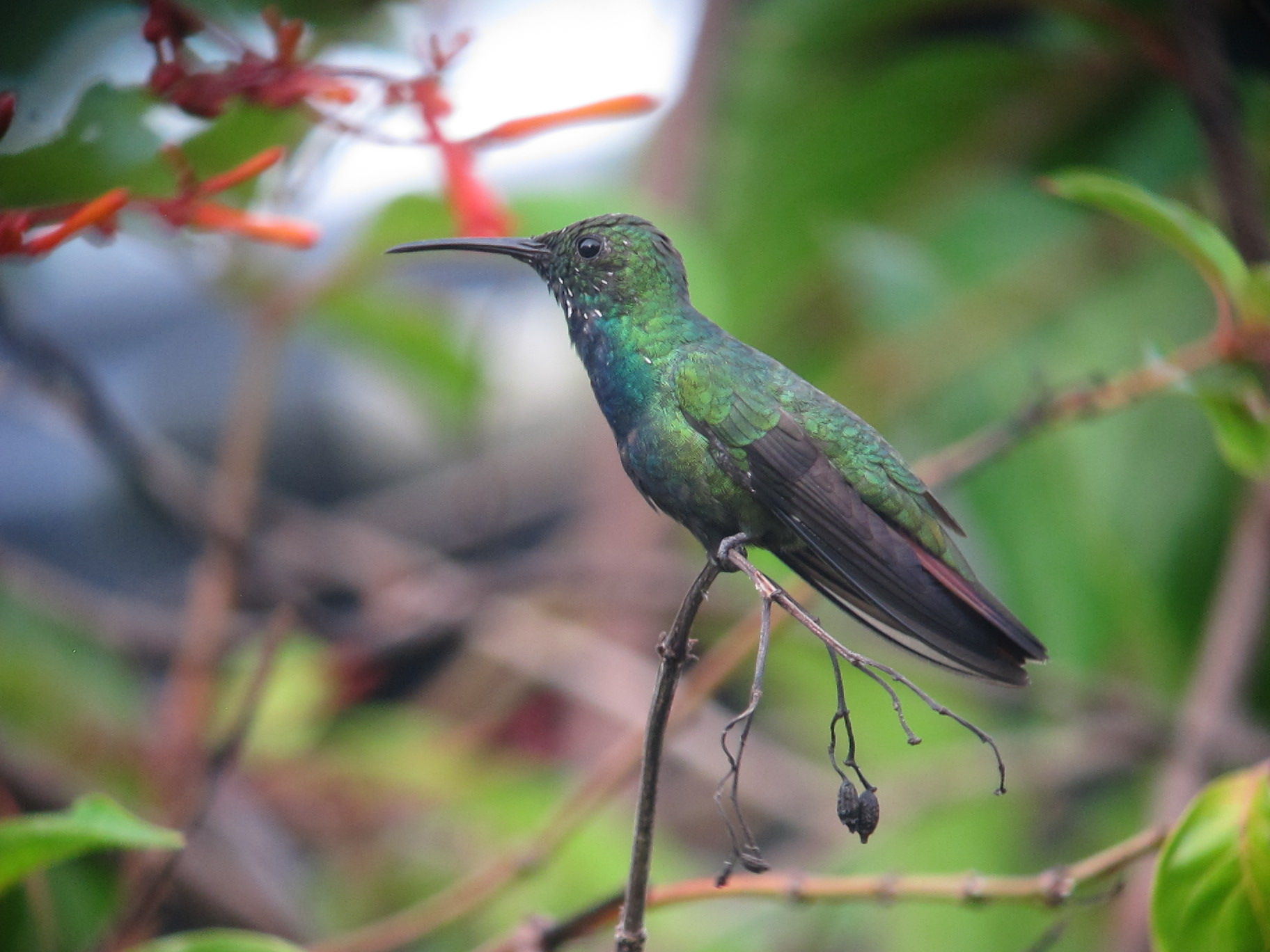
Green-breasted mango

Order: Apodiformes Family: Trochilidae

- Green-breasted mango (Anthracothorax prevostii)
- Ruby-throated hummingbird (Archilochus colubris) (A)

== Cuckoos ==
Order: Cuculiformes Family: Cuculidae

- Smooth-billed ani (Crotophaga ani)
- Yellow-billed cuckoo (Coccyzus americanus)
- Mangrove cuckoo (Coccyzus minor)
- Black-billed cuckoo (Coccyzus erythropthalmus)

== Rails ==
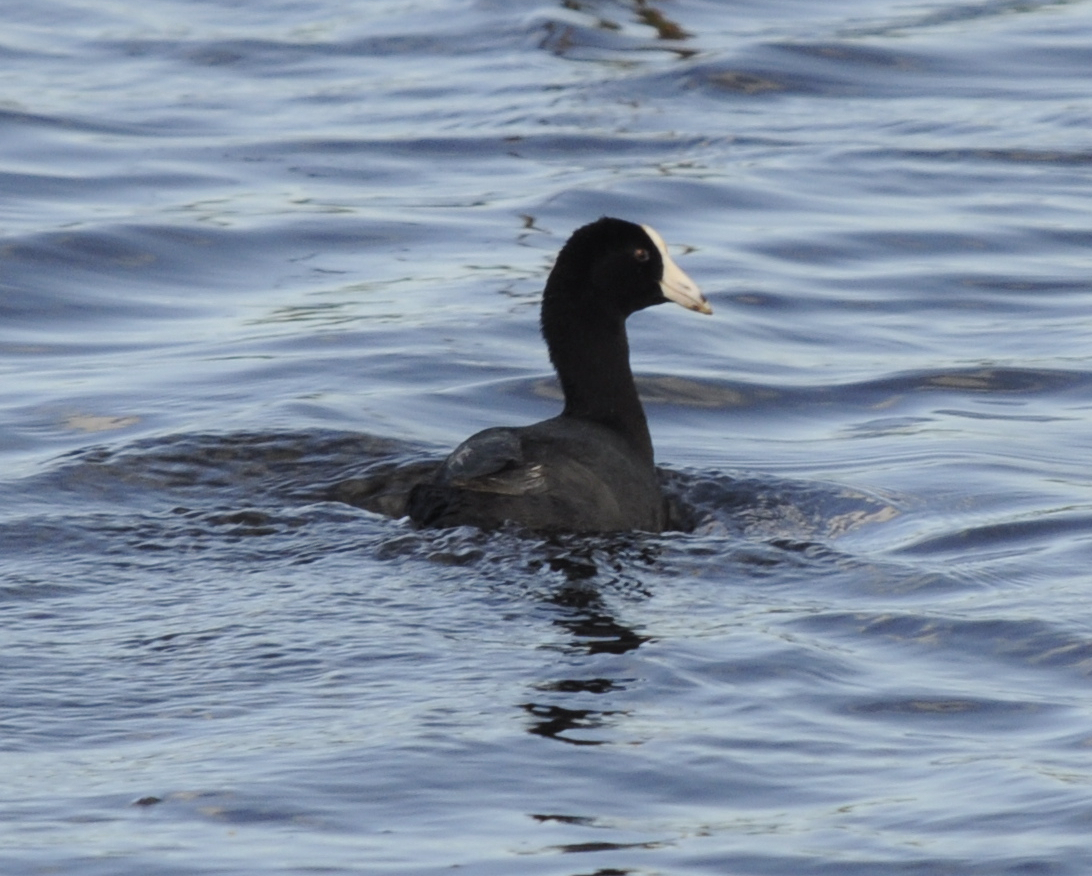
American coot

Order: Gruiformes Family: Rallidae

- Sora (Porzana carolina)
- Common gallinule (Gallinula galeata)
- American coot (Fulica americana)
- Purple gallinule (Porphyrio martinica)

== Grebes ==
Order: Podicipediformes Family: Podicipedidae

- Pied-billed grebe (Podilymbus podiceps)

== Flamingos ==
Order: Phoenicopteriformes Family: Phoenicopteridae

- American flamingo (Phoenicopterus ruber)

== Oystercatchers ==
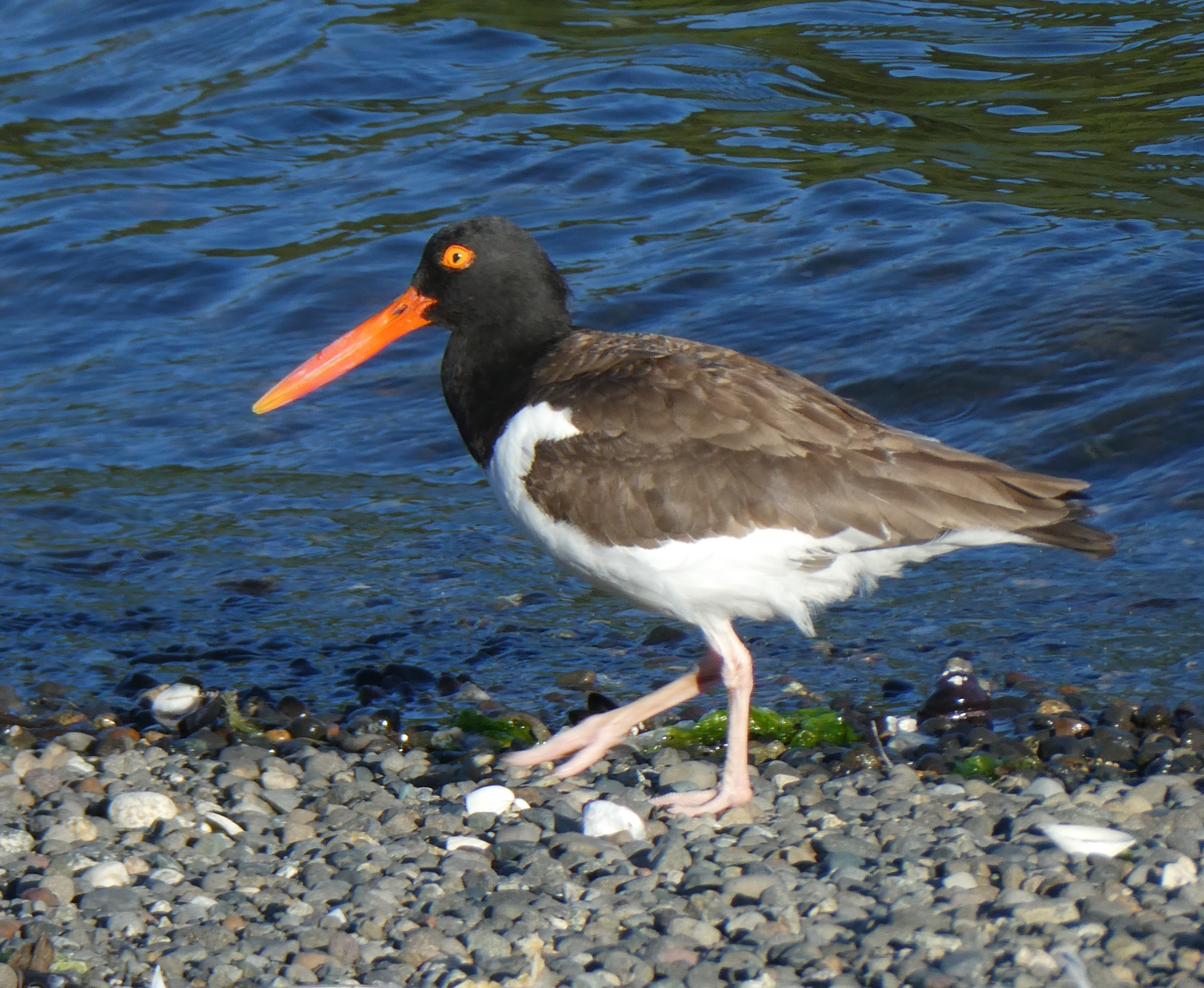
American oystercatcher

Order: Charadriiformes Family: Haematopodidae

- American oystercatcher (Haematopus palliatus)

== Stilts and avocets ==
Order: Charadriiformes Family: Recurvirostridae

- Black-necked stilt (Himantopus mexicanus)
- American avocet (Recurvirostra americana) (A)

== Plovers and lapwings ==
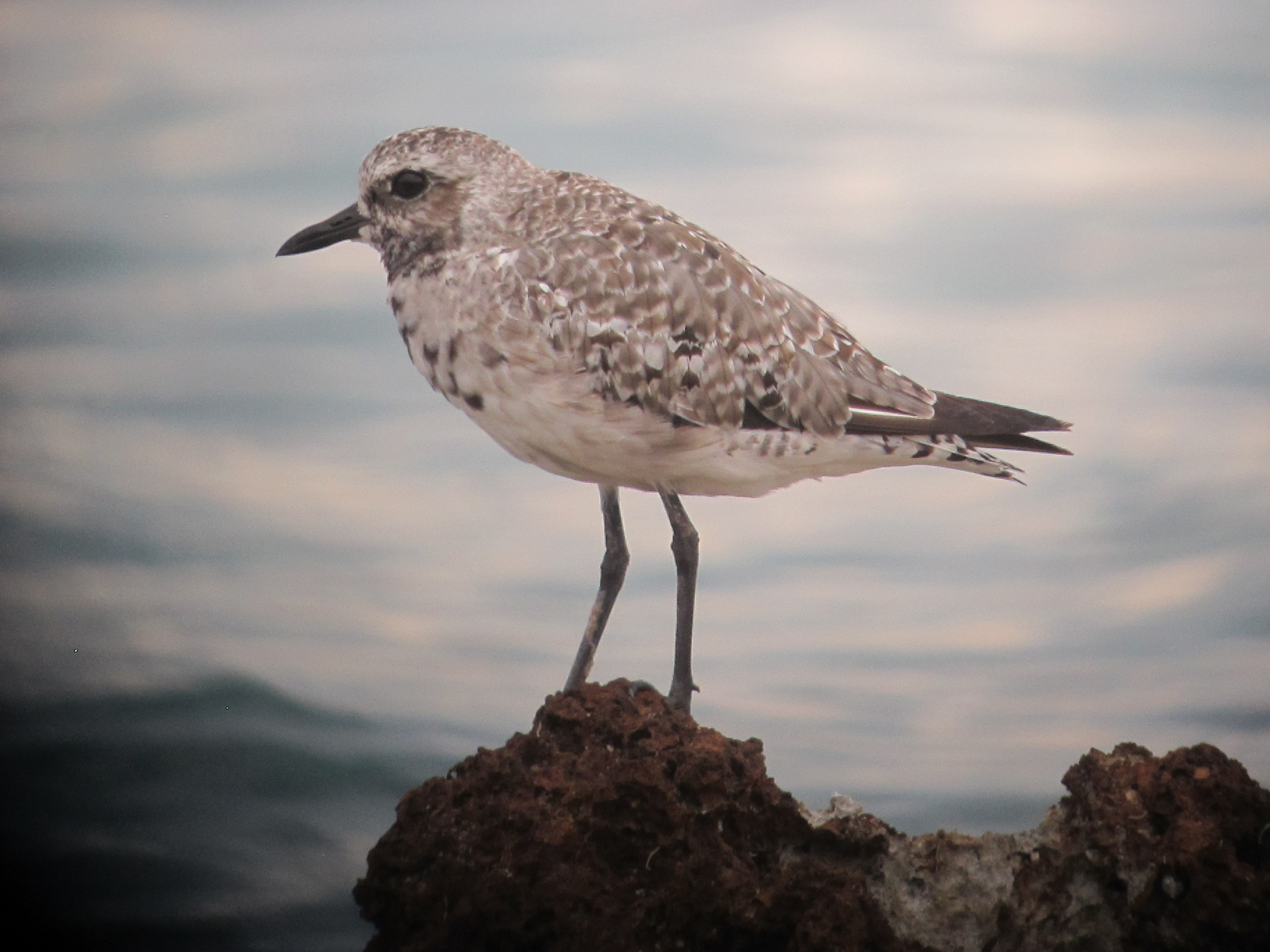
Black-bellied plover

Order: Charadriiformes Family: Charadriidae

- Black-bellied plover (Pluvialis squatarola)
- American golden plover (Pluvialis dominica)
- Killdeer (Charadrius vociferus)
- Semipalmated plover (Charadrius semipalmatus)
- Southern lapwing (Vanellus chilensis) (A)
- Wilson's plover (Anarhynchus wilsonia) (A)

== Sandpipers ==
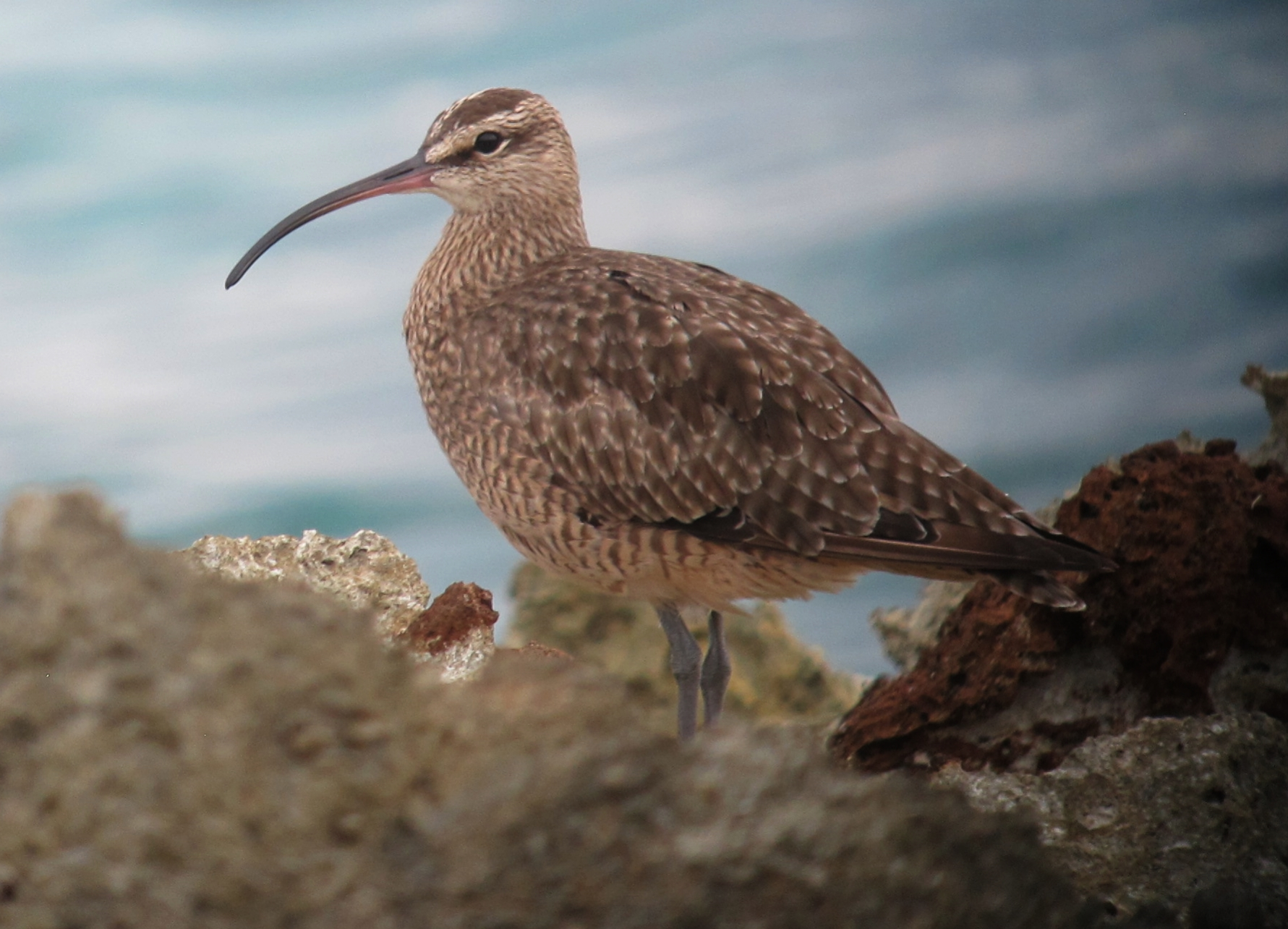
Whimbrel

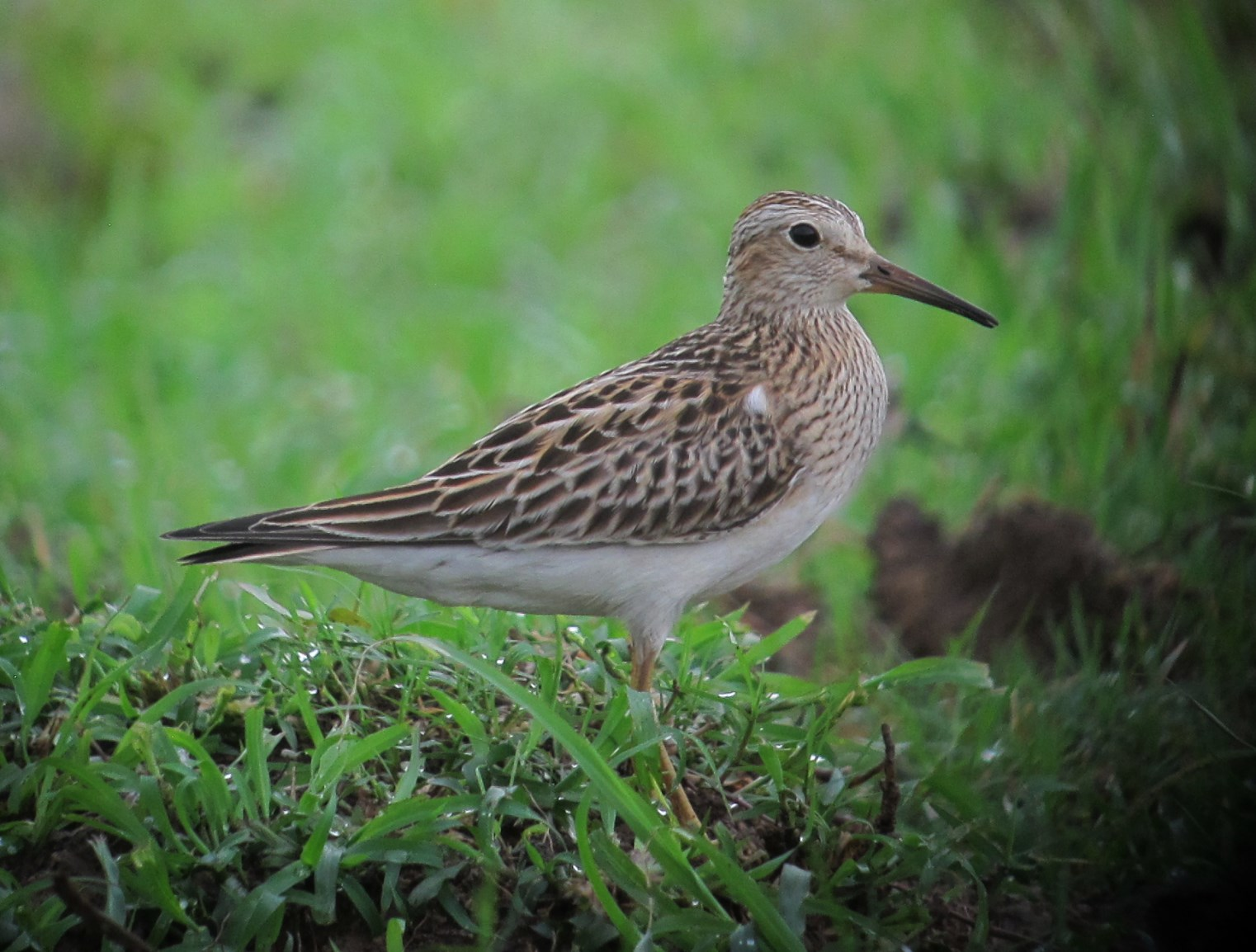
Pectoral sandpiper

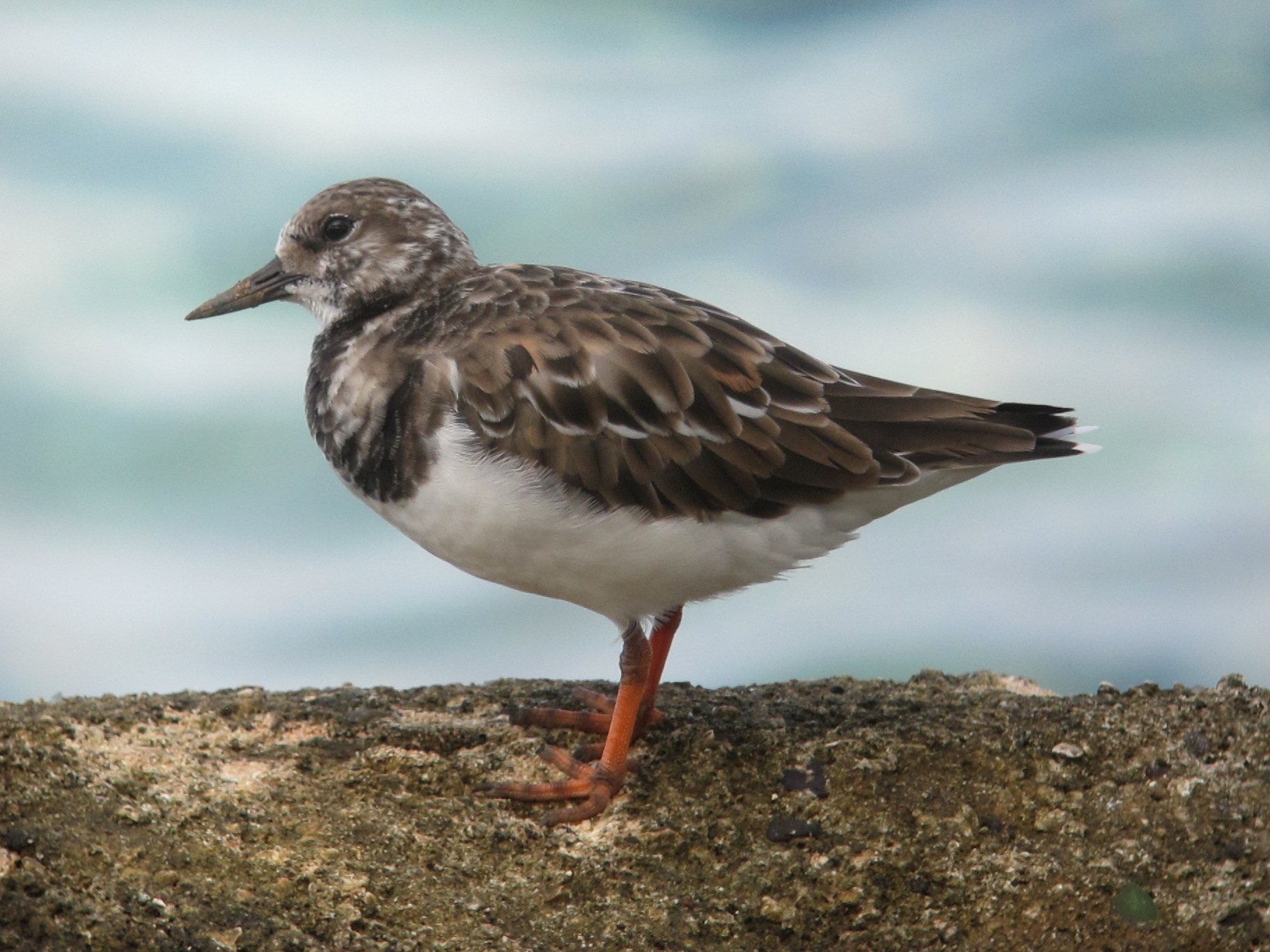
Ruddy turnstone

Order: Charadriiformes Family: Scolopacidae

- Upland sandpiper (Bartramia longicauda)
- Whimbrel (Numenius phaeopus)
- Marbled godwit (Limosa fedoa) (A)
- Short-billed dowitcher (Limnodromus griseus)
- Long-billed dowitcher (Limnodromus scolopaceus) (A)
- Wilson's snipe (Gallinago delicata)
- Wilson's phalarope (Phalaropus tricolor)
- Spotted sandpiper (Actitis macularius)
- Solitary sandpiper (Tringa solitaria)
- Lesser yellowlegs (Tringa flavipes)
- Willet (Tringa semipalmata)
- Greater yellowlegs (Tringa melanoleuca)
- Ruddy turnstone (Arenaria interpres)
- Red knot (Calidris canutus)
- Stilt sandpiper (Calidris himantopus)
- Sanderling (Calidris alba)
- Baird's sandpiper (Calidris bairdii)
- Least sandpiper (Calidris minutilla)
- White-rumped sandpiper (Calidris fuscicollis)
- Pectoral sandpiper (Calidris melanotos)
- Western sandpiper (Calidris mauri)
- Semipalmated sandpiper (Calidris pusilla)

== Skuas and jaegers ==
Order: Charadriiformes Family: Stercorariidae

- Parasitic jaeger (Stercorarius parasiticus)
- Pomarine jaeger (Stercorarius pomarinus)

== Gulls, terns, and skimmers ==
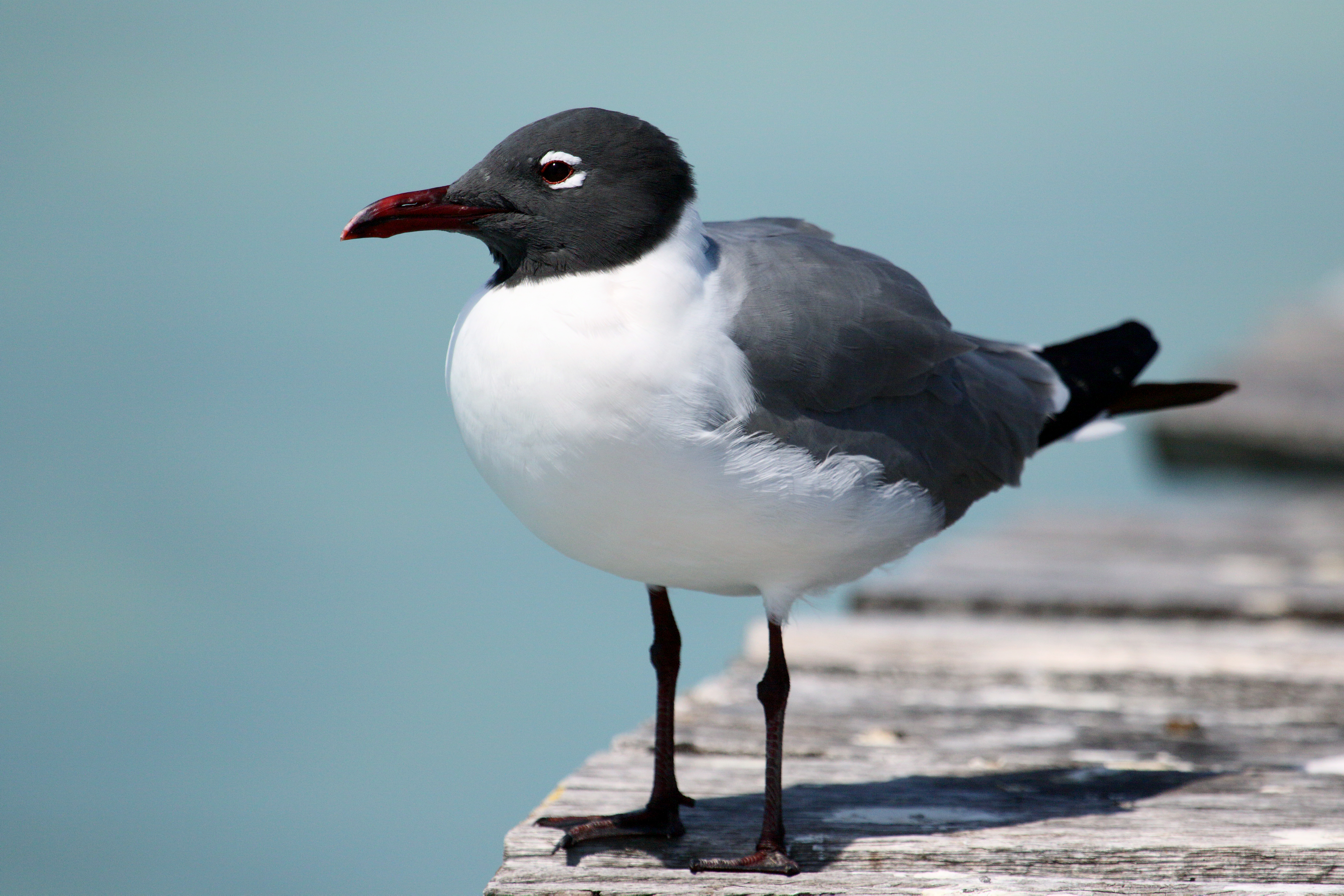
Laughing gull

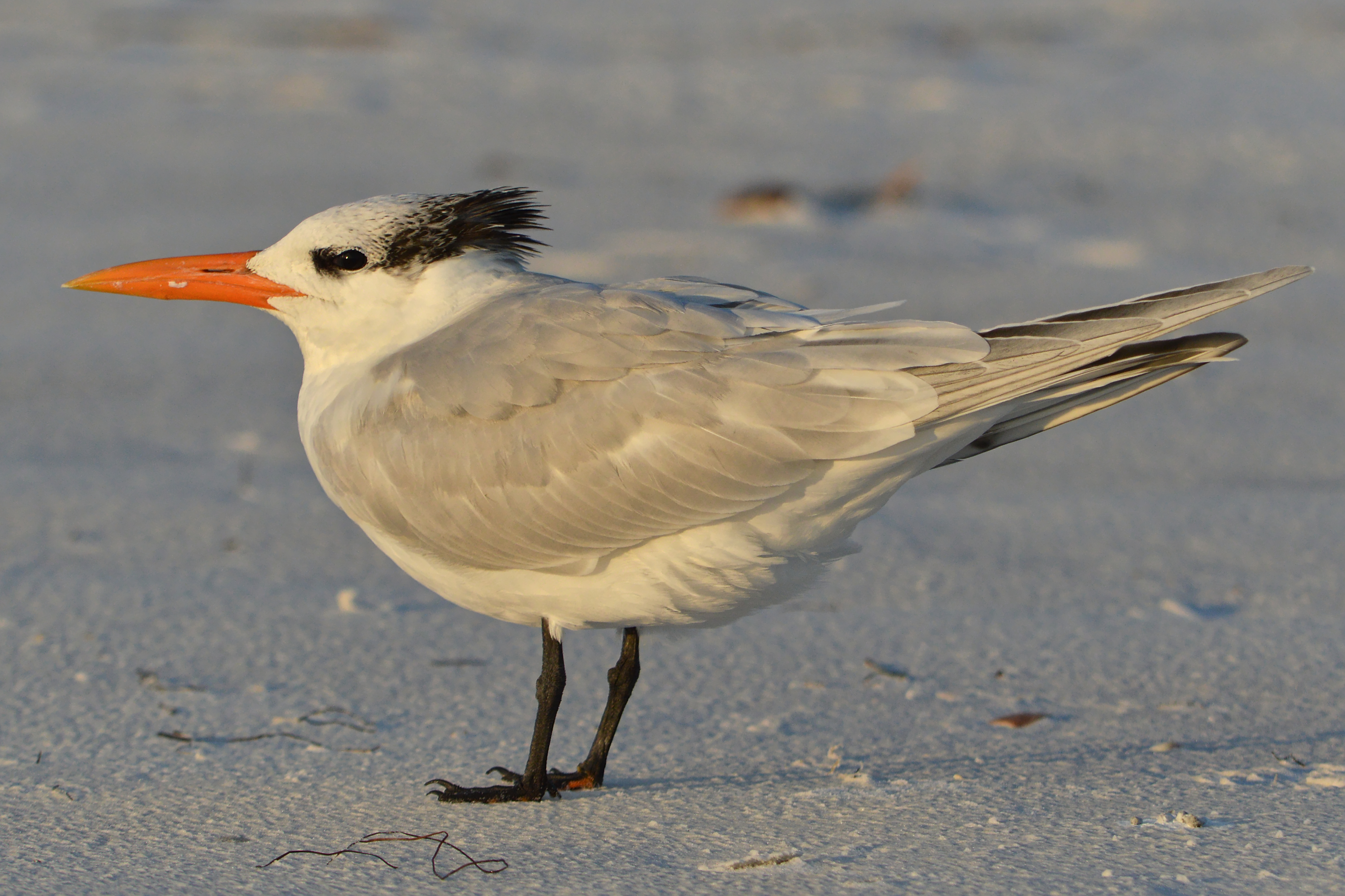
Royal tern

Order: Charadriiformes Family: Laridae

- Laughing gull (Leucophaeus atricilla)
- Franklin's gull (Leucophaeus pipixcan)
- Ring-billed gull (Larus delawarensis) (A)
- American herring gull (Larus smithsonianus) (A)
- Brown noddy (Anous stolidus)
- Black skimmer (Rynchops niger)
- Sooty tern (Onychoprion fuscatus)
- Bridled tern (Onychoprion anaethetus)
- Least tern (Sternula antillarum)
- Gull-billed tern (Gelochelidon nilotica)
- Caspian tern (Hydroprogne caspia)
- Black tern (Chlidonias niger)
- Forster's tern (Sterna forsteri) (A)
- Common tern (Sterna hirundo)
- Roseate tern (Sterna dougallii) (A)
- Sandwich tern (Thalasseus sandvicensis)
- Elegant tern (Thalasseus elegans) (A)
- Royal tern (Thalasseus maximus)

== Tropicbirds ==
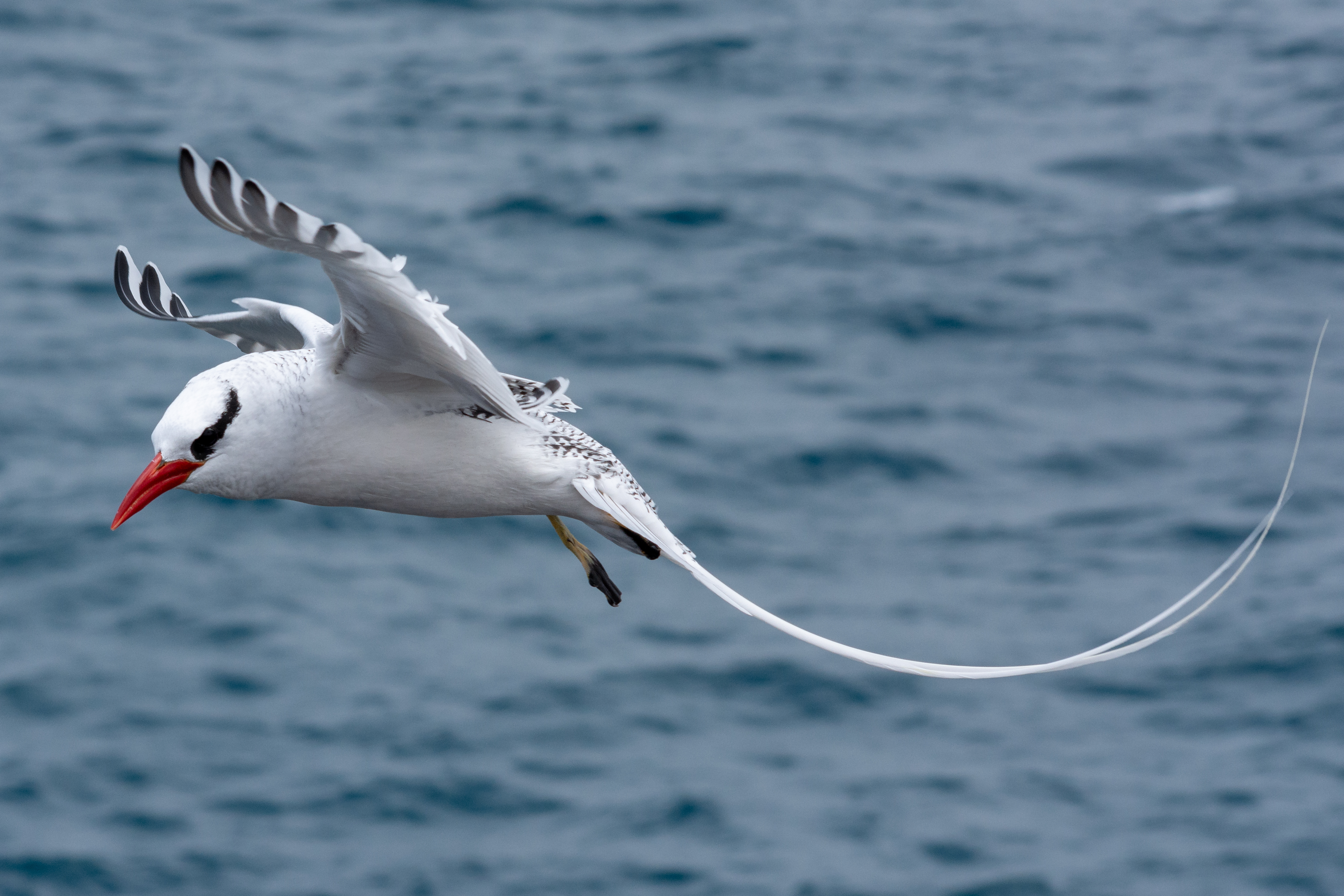
Red-billed tropicbird

Order: Phaethontiformes Family: Phaethontidae

- White-tailed tropicbird (Phaethon lepturus)
- Red-billed tropicbird (Phaethon aethereus)

== Northern storm petrels ==
Order: Procellariiformes Family: Hydrobatidae

- Leach's storm-petrel (Hydrobates leucorhous) (A)

== Petrels and shearwaters ==
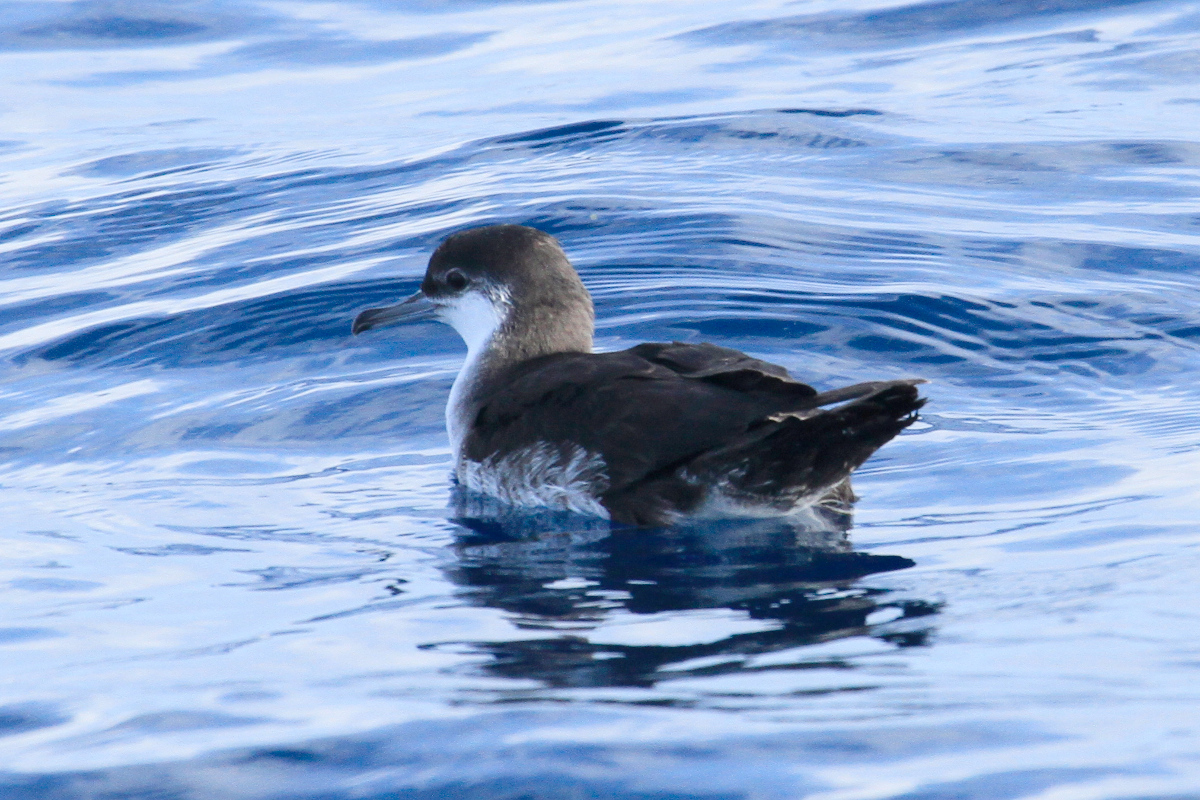
Sargasso shearwater

Order: Procellariiformes Family: Procellariidae

- Black-capped petrel (Pterodroma hasitata) (A)
- Manx shearwater (Puffinus puffinus) (A)
- Sargasso shearwater (Puffinus lherminieri)

== Frigatebirds ==
Order: Pelecaniformes Family: Fregatidae

- Magnificent frigatebird (Fregata magnificens)

== Boobies and gannets ==
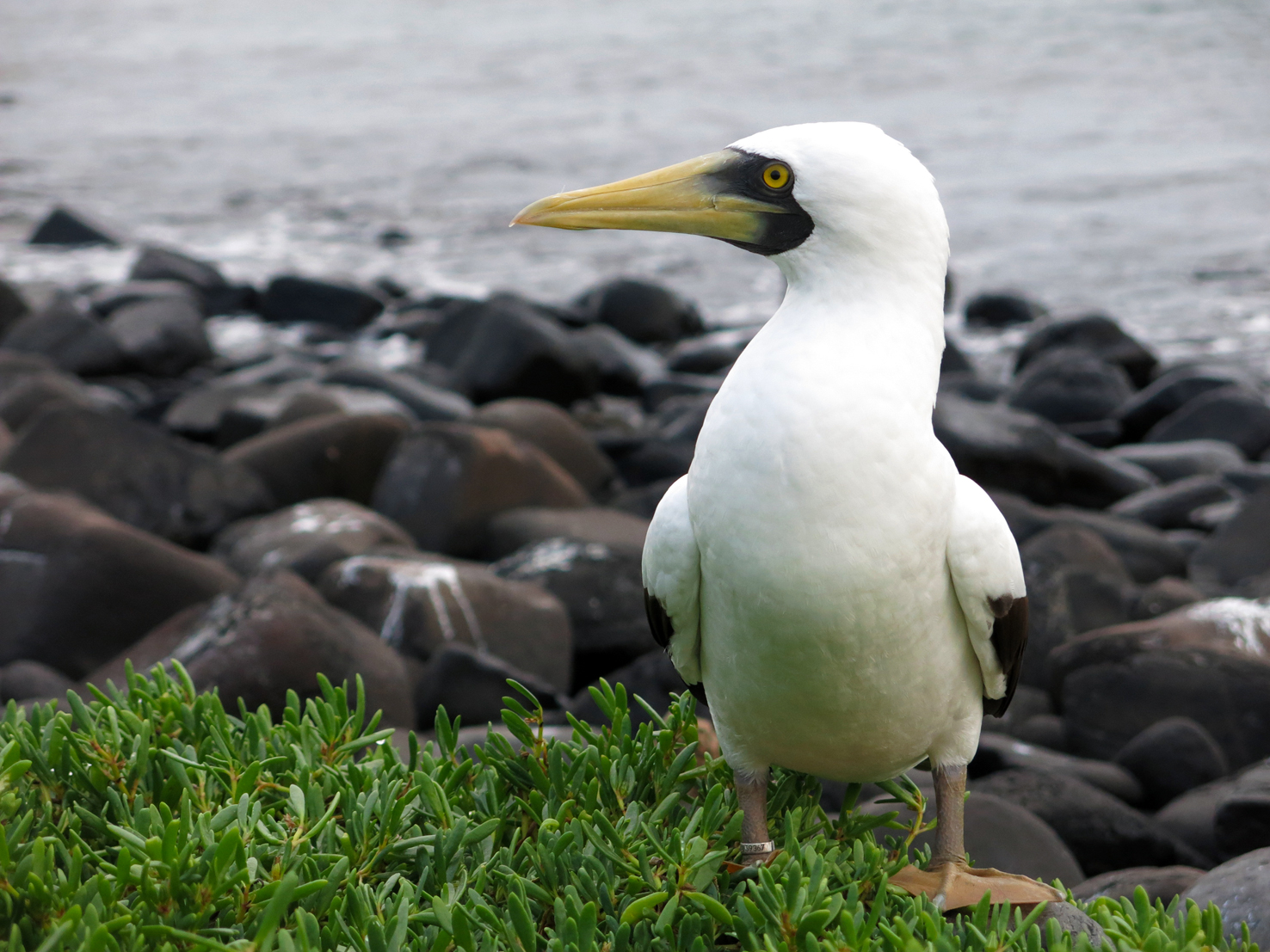
Masked booby

Order: Pelecaniformes Family: Sulidae

- Red-footed booby (Sula sula)
- Masked booby (Sula dactylatra)
- Brown booby (Sula leucogaster)

== Anhingas ==
Order: Pelecaniformes Family: Anhingidae

- Anhinga (Anhinga anhinga)

== Cormorants ==
Order: Pelecaniformes Family: Phalacrocoracidae

- Neotropic cormorant (Phalacrocorax brasilianus) (A)
- Double-crested cormorant (Nannopterum auritum) (A)

== Ibises and spoonbills ==
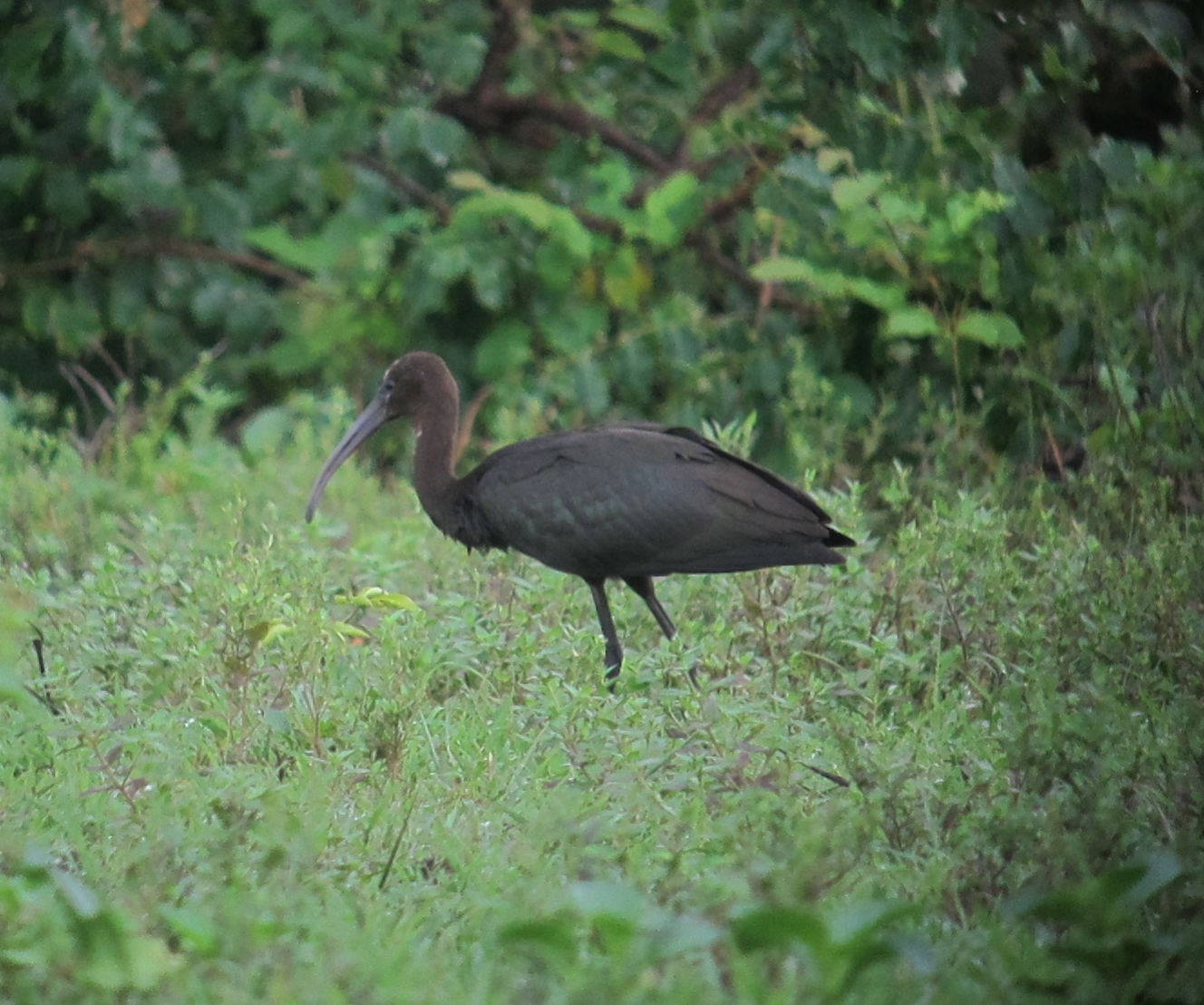
Glossy ibis

Order: Pelecaniformes Family: Threskiornithidae

- White ibis (Eudocimus albus)
- Glossy ibis (Plegadis falcinellus)
- White-faced ibis (Plegadis chihi) (A)

== Herons and egrets ==
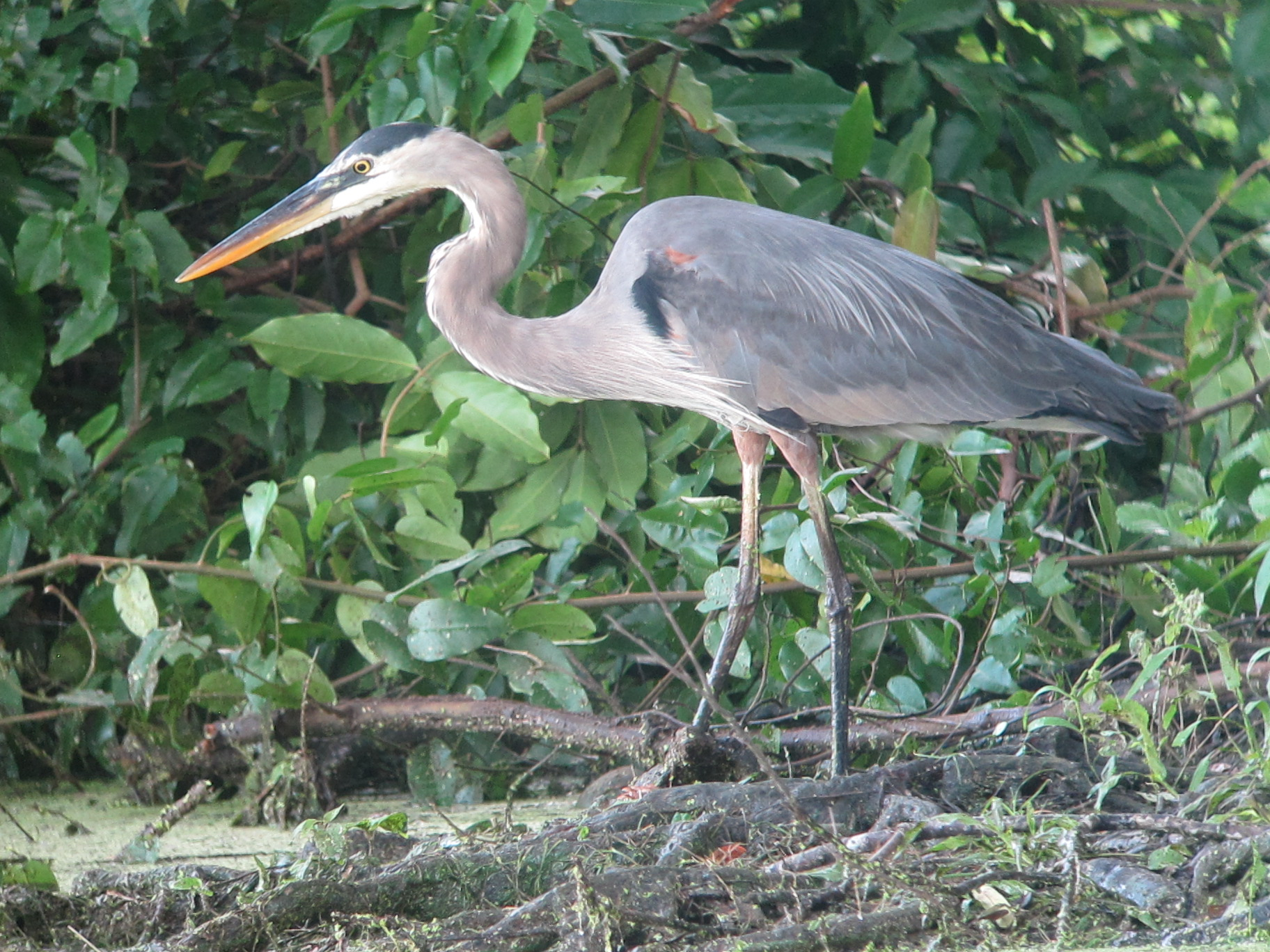
Great blue heron

Order: Pelecaniformes Family: Ardeidae

- Least bittern (Botaurus exilis)
- Yellow-crowned night-heron (Nyctanassa violacea)
- Black-crowned night-heron (Nycticorax nycticorax) (A)
- Whistling heron (Syrigma sibilatrix)
- Little blue heron (Egretta caerulea)
- Tricoloured heron (Egretta tricolor)
- Reddish egret (Egretta rufescens)
- Snowy egret (Egretta thula)
- Striated heron (Butorides striata) (A)
- Green heron (Butorides virescens)
- Great egret (Ardea alba)
- Western cattle egret (Ardea ibis)
- Great blue heron (Ardea herodias)

== Pelicans ==
Order: Pelecaniformes Family: Pelecanidae

- American white pelican (Pelecanus erythrorhynchos) (A)
- Brown pelican (Pelecanus occidentalis)

== New World vultures ==
Order: Cathartiformes Family: Cathartidae

- Turkey vulture (Cathartes aura)

== Ospreys ==
Order: Accipitriformes Family: Pandionidae

- Osprey (Pandion haliaetus)

== Hawks, kites, and eagles ==
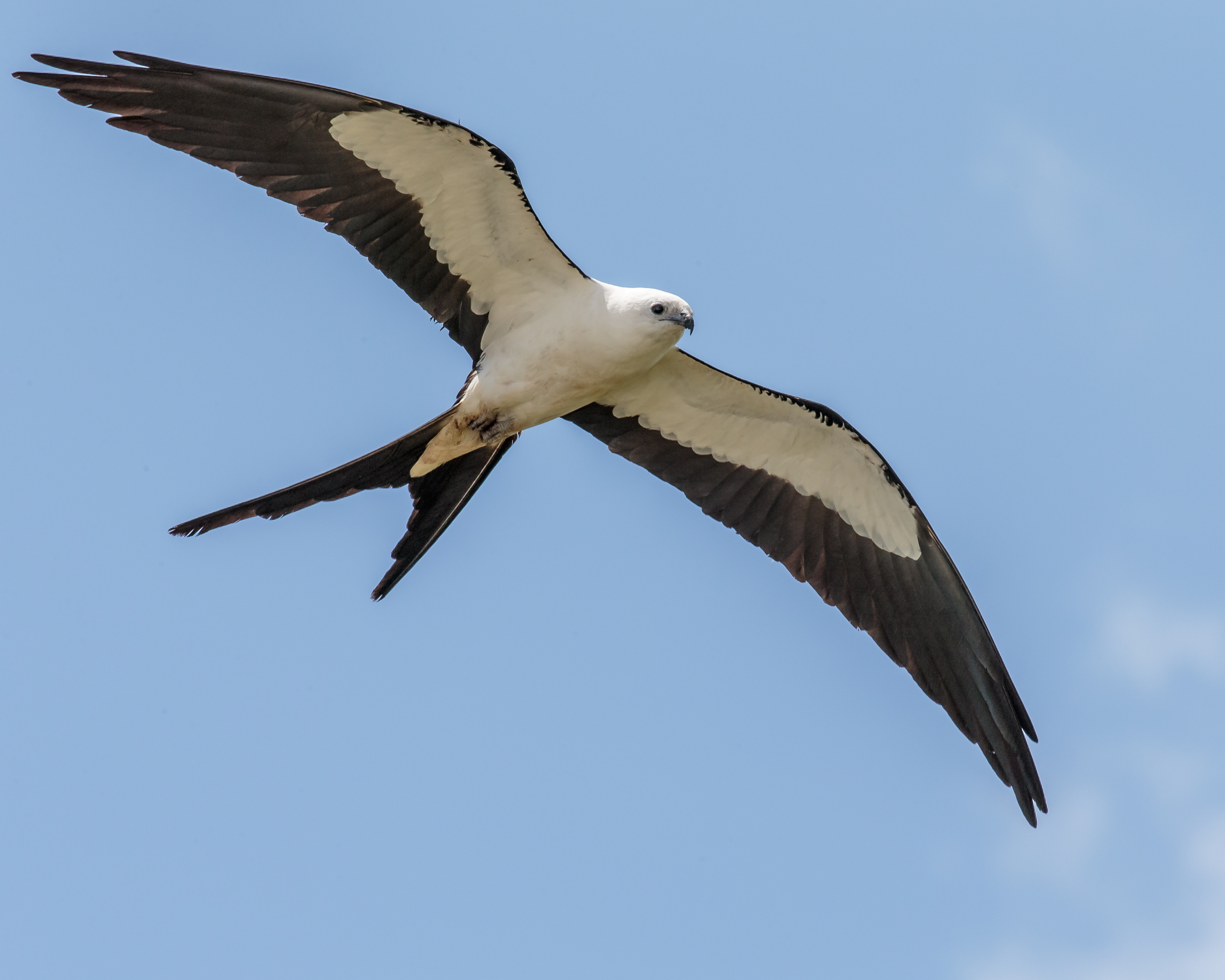
Swallow-tailed kite

Order: Accipitriformes Family: Accipitridae

- Swallow-tailed kite (Elanoides forficatus)
- Northern harrier (Circus hudsonius) (A)
- Mississippi kite (Ictinia mississippiensis)
- Broad-winged hawk (Buteo platypterus)
- Swainson's hawk (Buteo swainsoni)

== Kingfishers ==
Order: Coraciiformes Family: Alcedinidae

- Belted kingfisher (Megaceryle alcyon)

== Woodpeckers or piculet ==
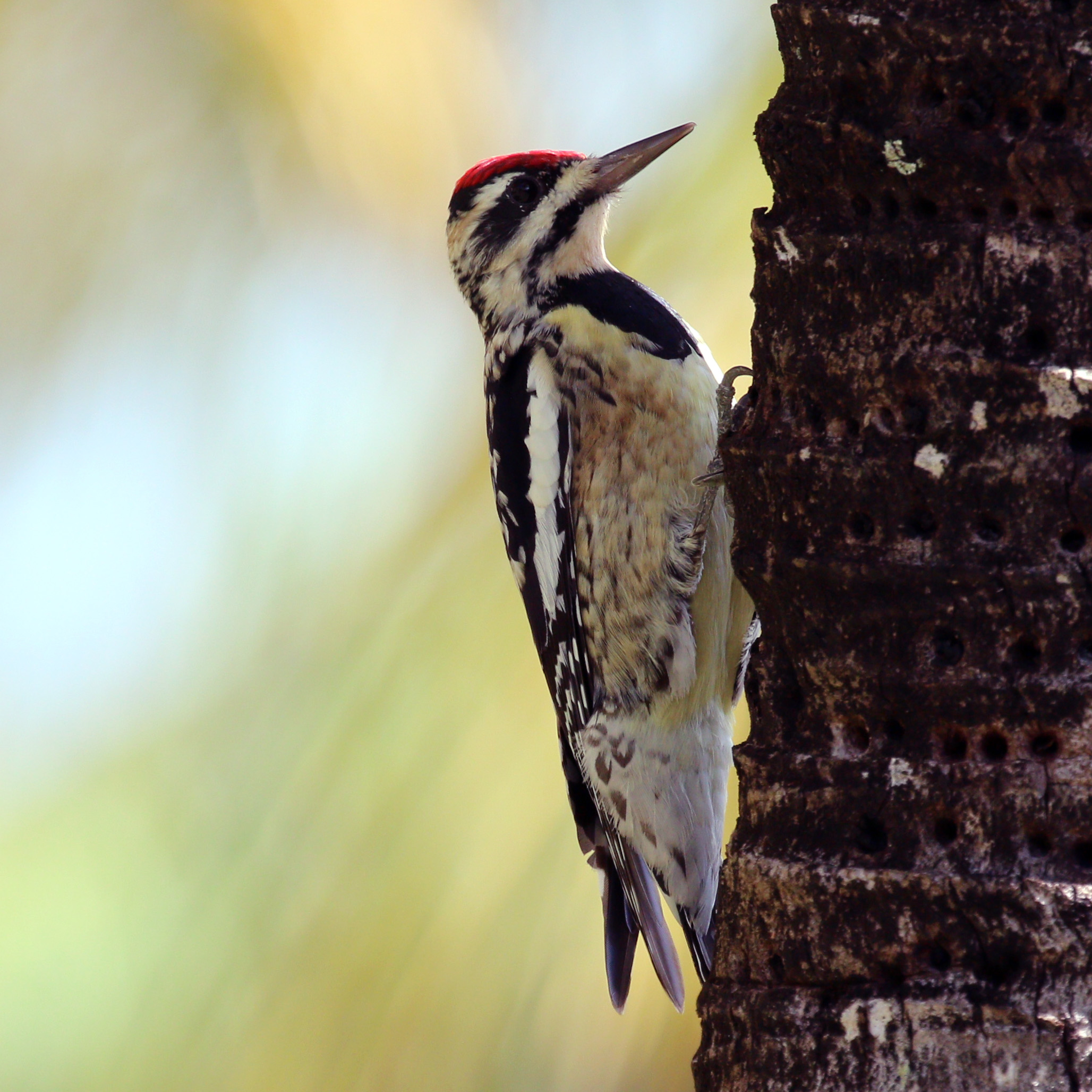
Yellow-bellied sapsucker

Order: Piciformes Family: Picidae

- Yellow-bellied sapsucker (Sphyrapicus varius)

== Falcons ==
Order: Falconiformes Family: Falconidae

- American kestrel (Falco sparverius)
- Merlin (Falco columbarius)
- Peregrine falcon (Falco peregrinus)

== Parrots ==
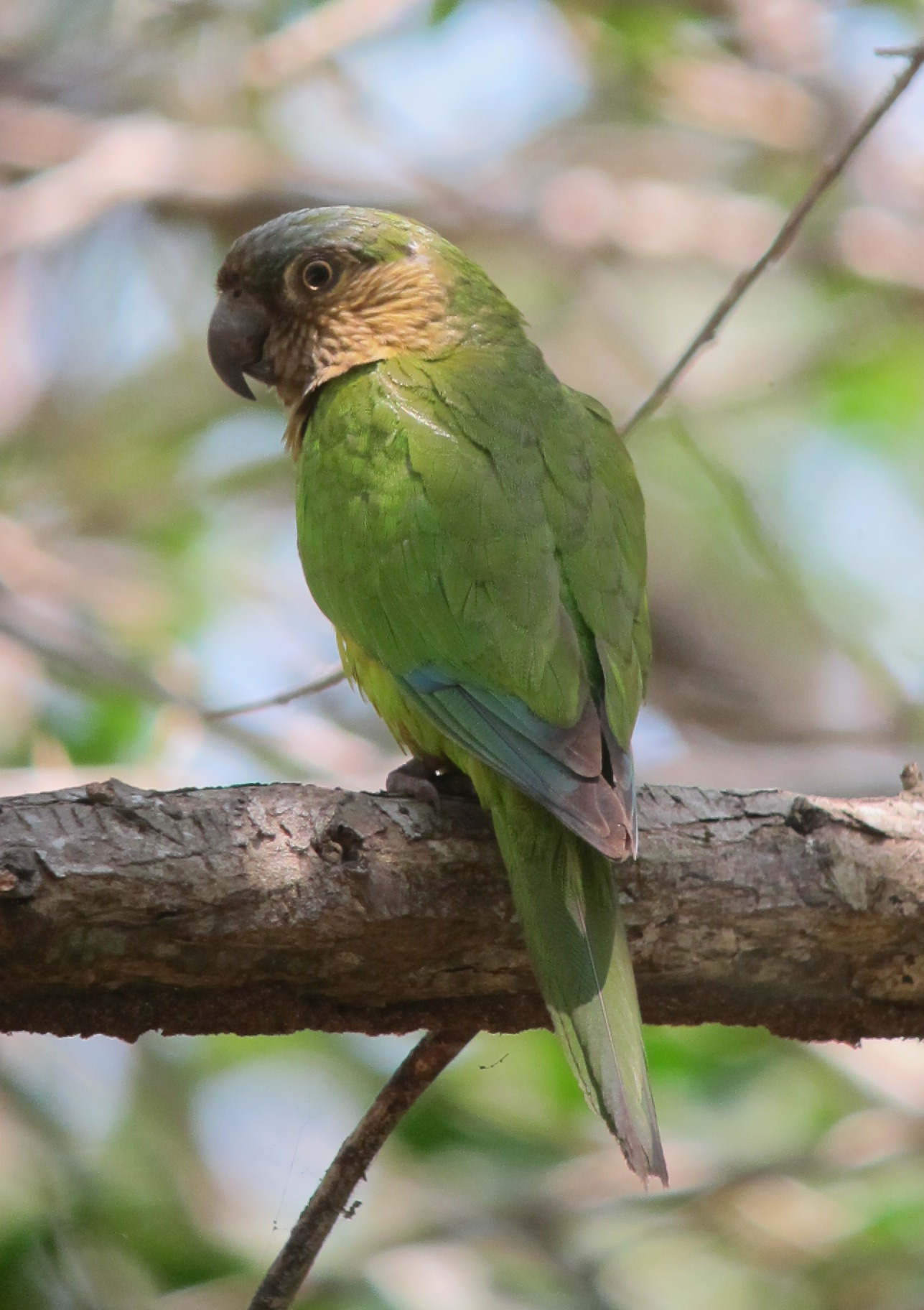
Brown-throated parakeet

Order: Psittaciformes Family: Psittacidae

- Brown-throated parakeet (Eupsittula pertinax) (I)

== Antbirds ==
Order: Passeriformes Family: Thamnophilidae

- Black-crowned antshrike (Thamnophilus atrinucha)

== Tyrant flycatchers ==
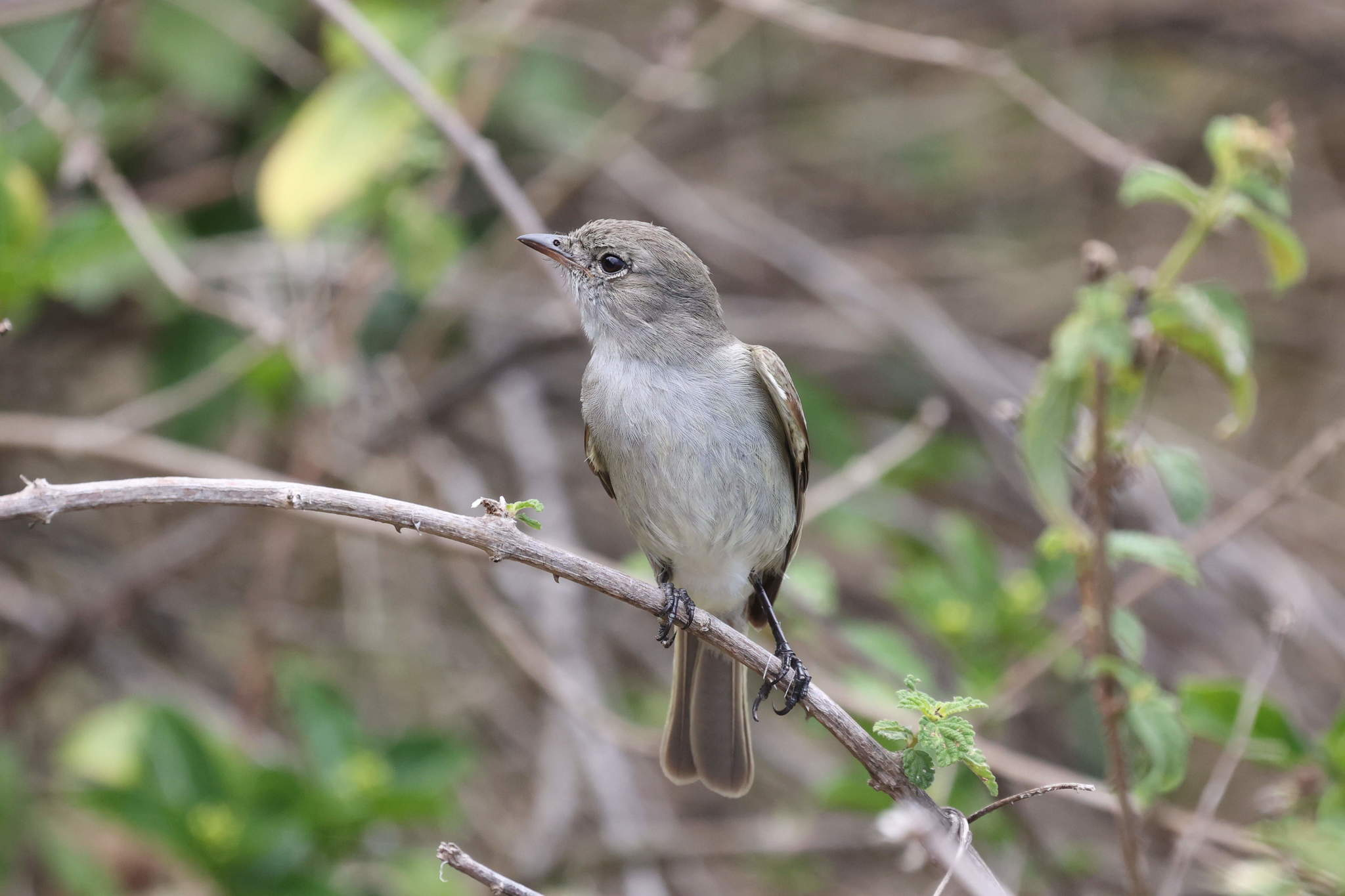
Caribbean elaenia

Order: Passeriformes Family: Tyrannidae

- Caribbean elaenia (Elaenia martinica)
- Olive-sided flycatcher (Contopus cooperi)
- Western wood-pewee (Contopus sordidulus)
- Eastern wood-pewee (Contopus virens)
- Yellow-bellied flycatcher (Empidonax flaviventris)
- Acadian flycatcher (Empidonax virescens)
- Willow flycatcher (Empidonax traillii)
- Alder flycatcher (Empidonax alnorum)
- Least flycatcher (Empidonax minimus) (A)
- Great crested flycatcher (Myiarchus crinitus)
- Piratic flycatcher (Legatus leucophaius) (A)
- Sulphur-bellied flycatcher (Myiodynastes luteiventris) (A)
- Tropical kingbird (Tyrannus melancholicus)
- Eastern kingbird (Tyrannus tyrannus)
- Grey kingbird (Tyrannus dominicensis)
- Fork-tailed flycatcher (Tyrannus savana) (A)

== Vireos ==
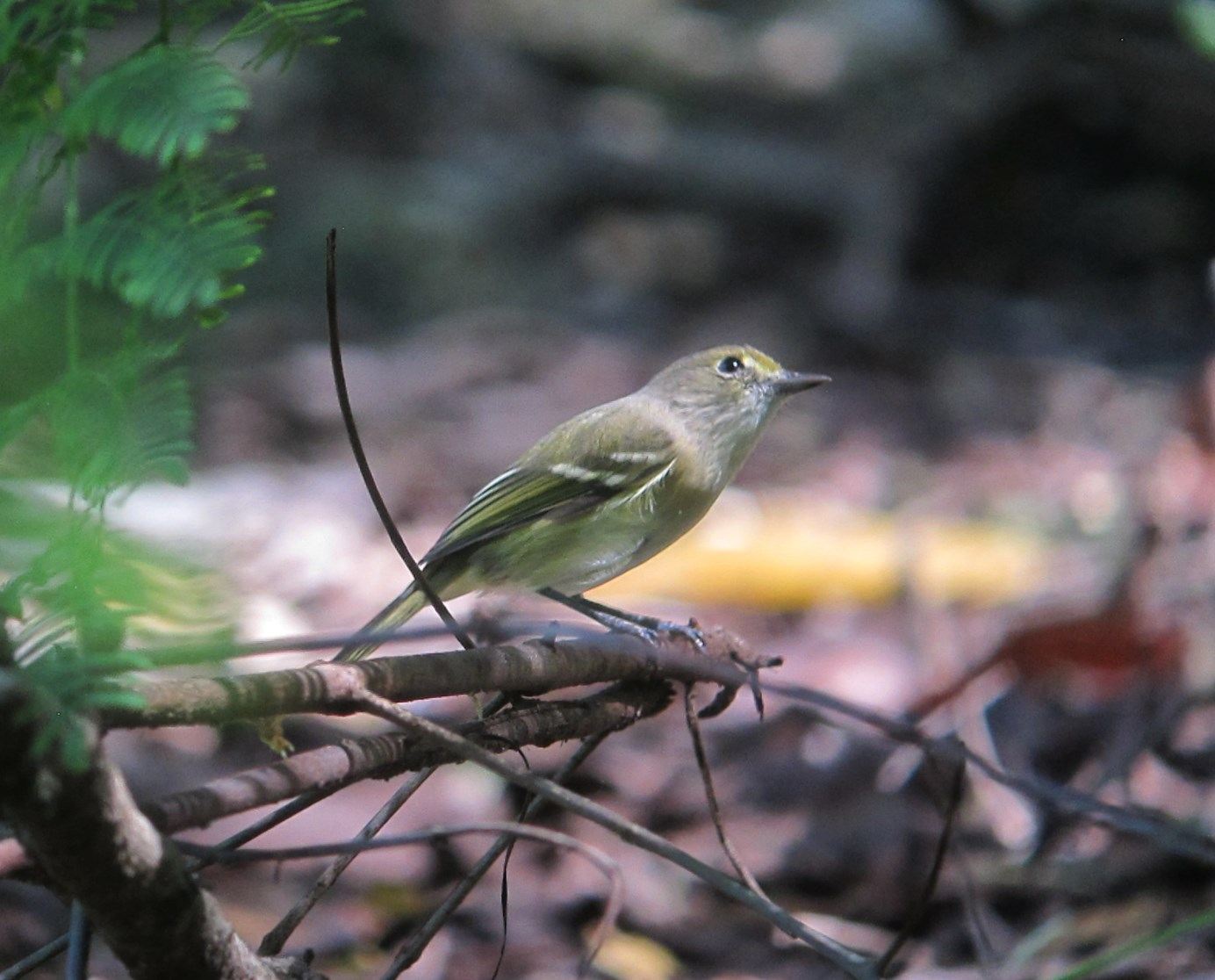
San Andrés vireo

Order: Passeriformes Family: Vireonidae

- White-eyed vireo (Vireo griseus)
- Providencia vireo (Vireo approximans) (En)
- San Andres vireo (Vireo caribaeus) (En)
- Yellow-throated vireo (Vireo flavifrons)
- Philadelphia vireo (Vireo philadelphicus)
- Red-eyed vireo (Vireo olivaceus)
- Yellow-green vireo (Vireo flavoviridis) (A)
- Black-whiskered vireo (Vireo altiloquus)

== Swallows and martins ==
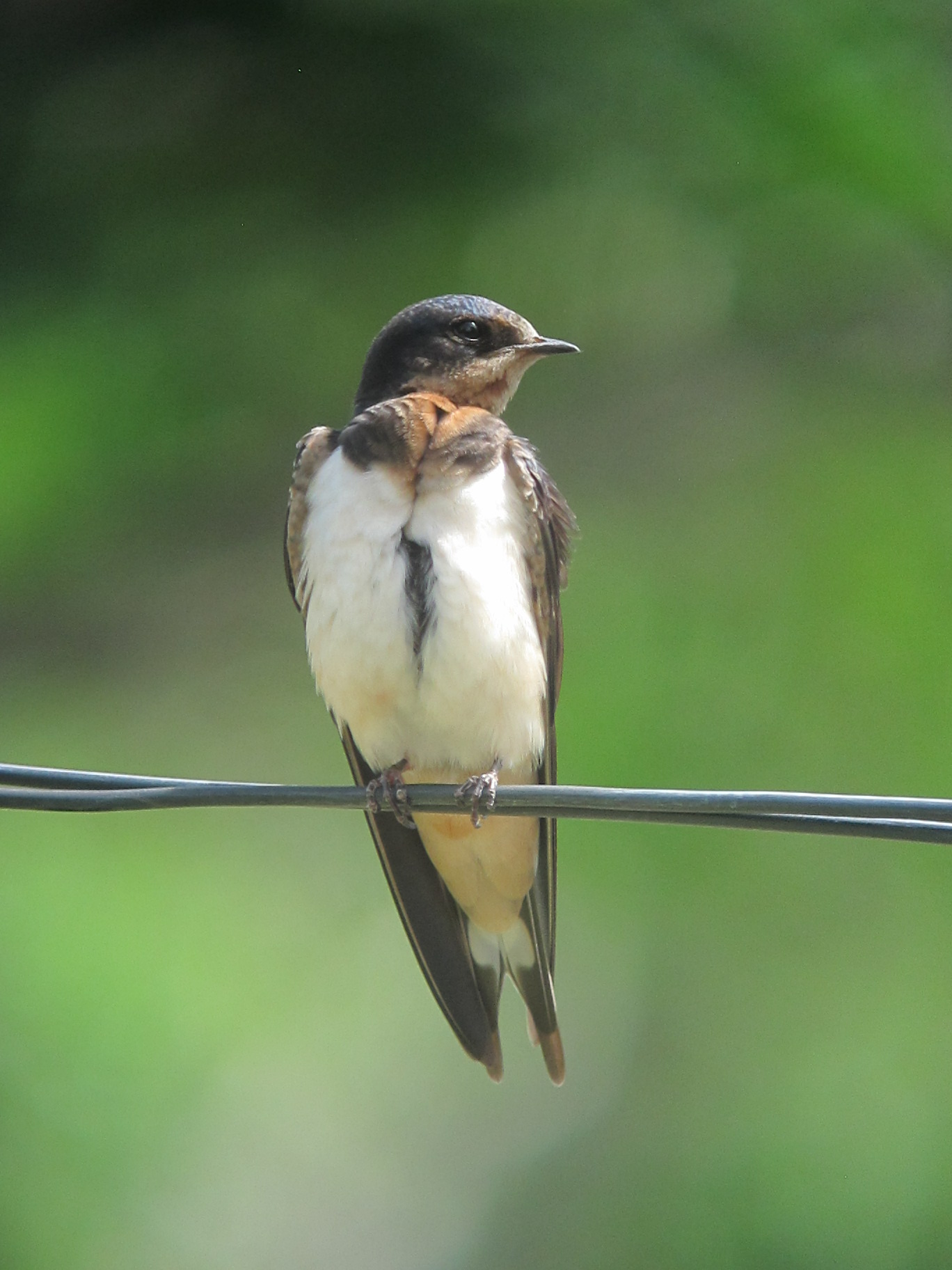
Barn swallow

Order: Passeriformes Family: Hirundinidae

- Bank swallow (Riparia riparia)
- Tree swallow (Tachycineta bicolor)
- Bahama swallow (Tachycineta cyaneoviridis) (A)
- Purple martin (Progne subis)
- Grey-breasted martin (Progne chalybea) (A)
- Brown-chested martin (Progne tapera)
- Northern rough-winged swallow (Stelgidopteryx serripennis)
- Barn swallow (Hirundo rustica)
- Cliff swallow (Petrochelidon pyrrhonota)
- Cave swallow (Petrochelidon fulva) (A)

== Mockingbirds, thrashers, and allies ==
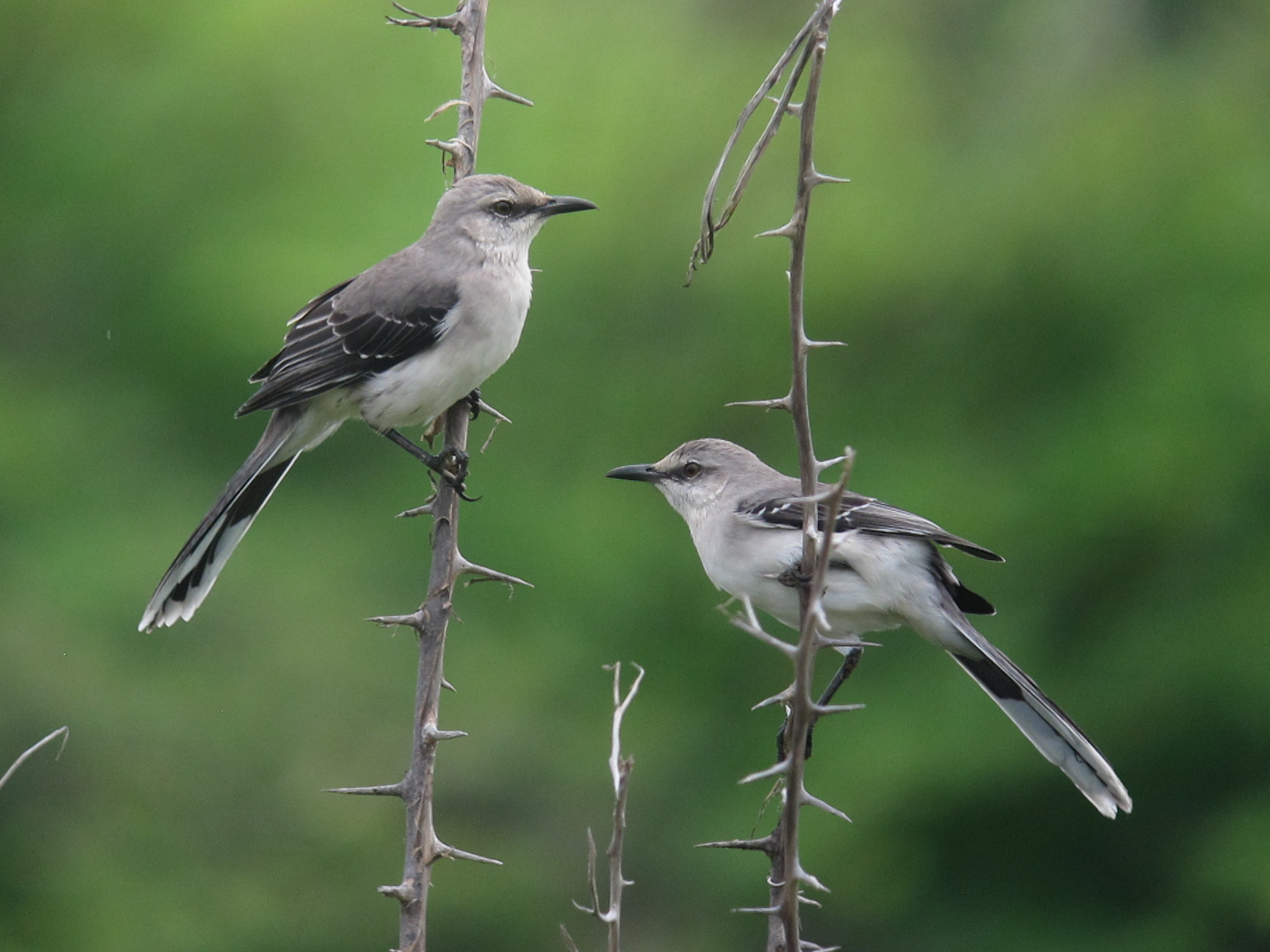
Tropical mockingbird

Order: Passeriformes Family: Mimidae

- Grey catbird (Dumetella carolinensis)
- Tropical mockingbird (Mimus gilvus)

== Thrushes ==
Order: Passeriformes Family: Turdidae

- Wood thrush (Hylocichla mustelina)
- Swainson's thrush (Catharus ustulatus)
- Veery (Catharus fuscescens)
- Grey-cheeked thrush (Catharus minimus)

== Pipits ==
Order: Passeriformes Family: Motacillidae

- American pipit (Anthus rubescens) (A)

== New World sparrows ==
Order: Passeriformes Family: Passerellidae

- Savannah sparrow (Passerculus sandwichensis) (A)
- Lincoln's sparrow (Melospiza lincolnii)

== Icterids ==
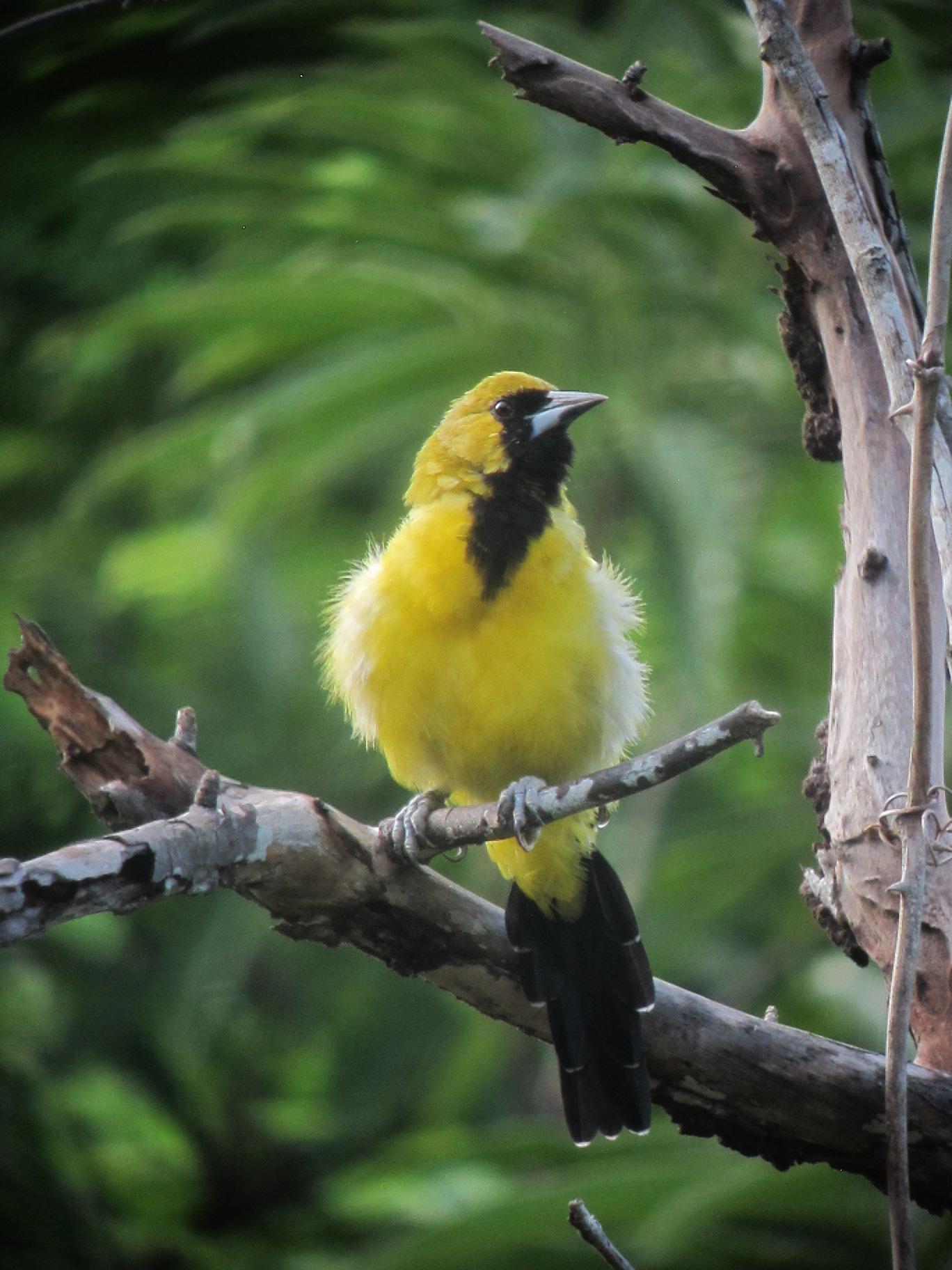
Jamaican oriole

Order: Passeriformes Family: Icteridae

- Bobolink (Dolichonyx oryzivorus)
- Orchard oriole (Icterus spurius)
- Jamaican oriole (Icterus leucopteryx)
- Baltimore oriole (Icterus galbula)
- Great-tailed grackle (Quiscalus mexicanus)
- Carib grackle (Quiscalus lugubris)

== New World warblers ==
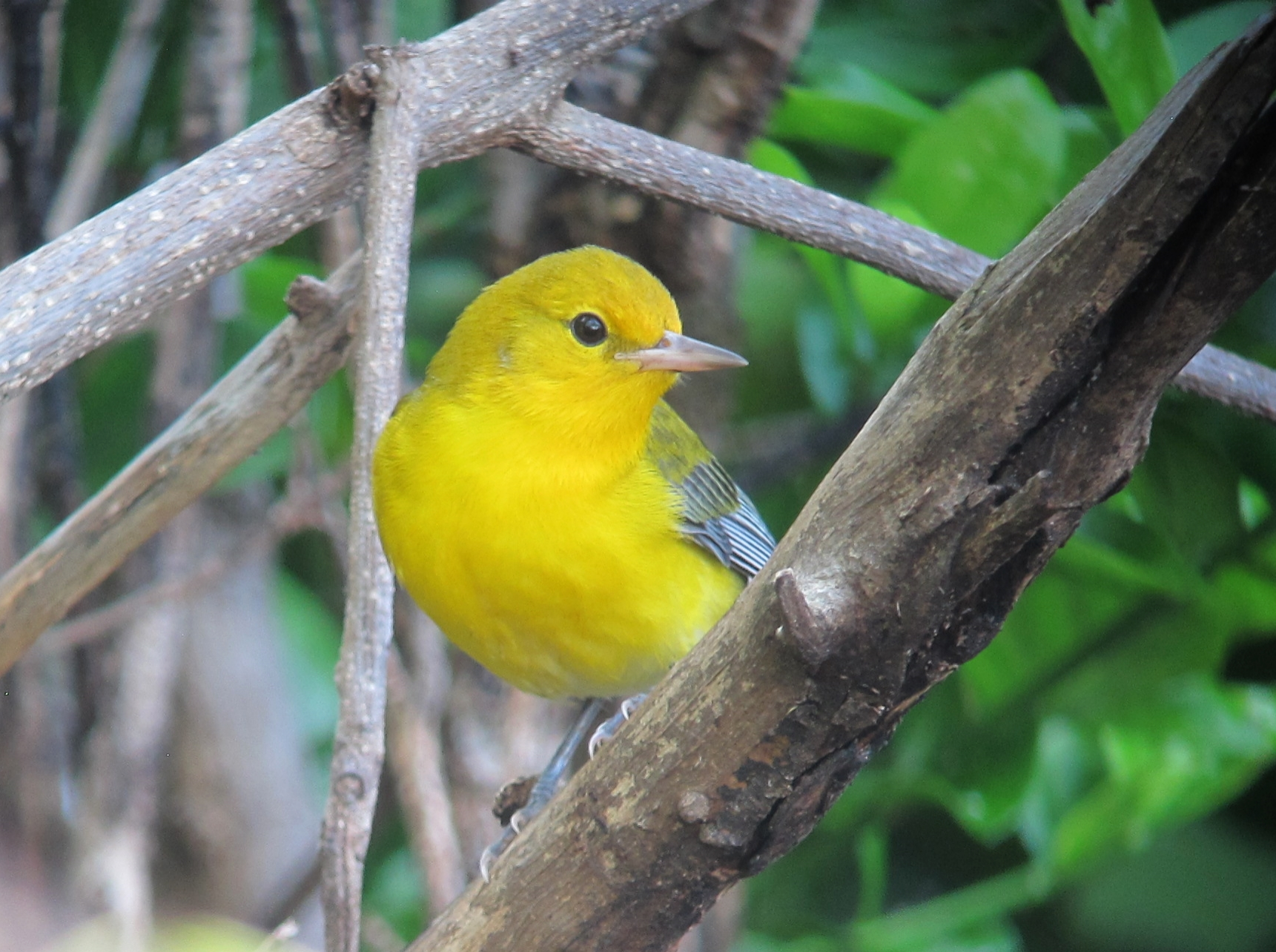
Prothonotary warbler

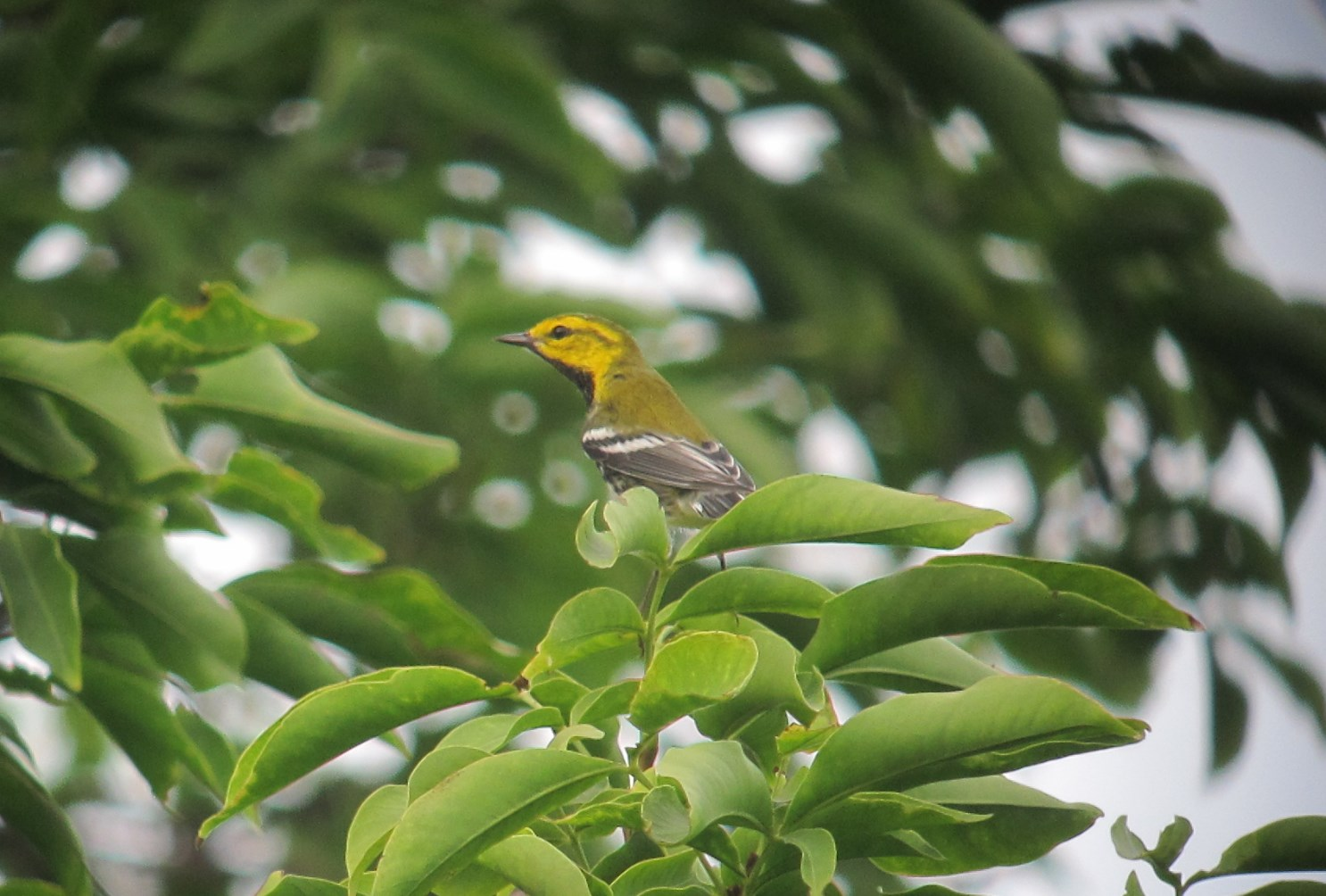
Black-throated green warbler

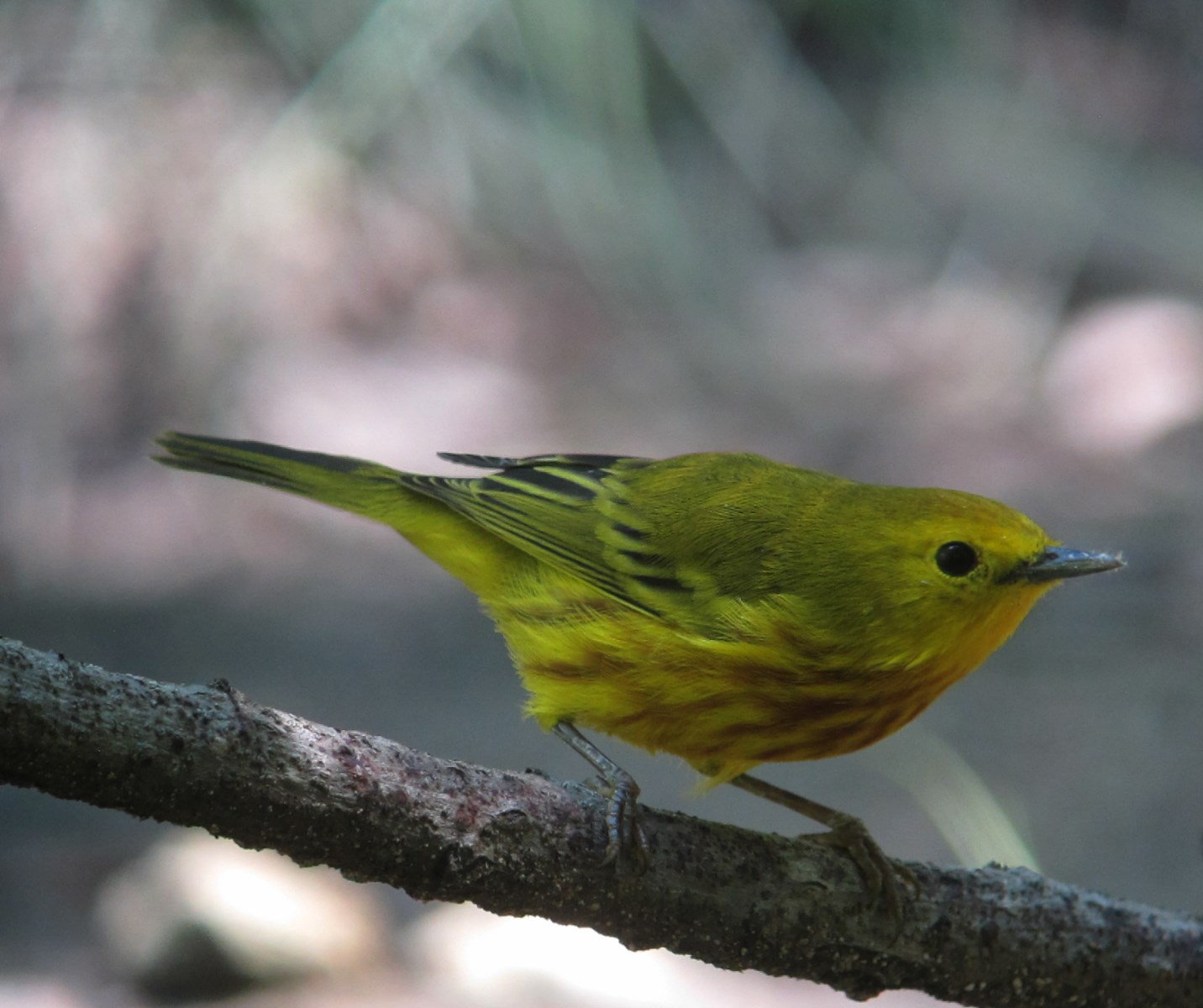
Yellow warbler

Order: Passeriformes Family: Parulidae

- Ovenbird (Seiurus aurocapilla)
- Worm-eating warbler (Helmitheros vermivorum)
- Louisiana waterthrush (Parkesia motacilla)
- Northern waterthrush (Parkesia noveboracensis)
- Golden-winged warbler (Vermivora chrysoptera) (A)
- Blue-winged warbler (Vermivora cyanoptera) (A)
- Black-and-white warbler (Mniotilta varia)
- Prothonotary warbler (Protonotaria citrea)
- Swainson's warbler (Limnothlypis swainsonii)
- Tennessee warbler (Leiothlypis peregrina)
- Nashville warbler (Leiothlypis ruficapilla) (A)
- Mourning warbler (Geothlypis philadelphia)
- Kentucky warbler (Geothlypis formosa)
- Common yellowthroat (Geothlypis trichas)
- Hooded warbler (Setophaga citrina)
- American redstart (Setophaga ruticilla)
- Cape May warbler (Setophaga tigrina)
- Cerulean warbler (Setophaga cerulea)
- Northern parula (Setophaga americana)
- Magnolia warbler (Setophaga magnolia)
- Bay-breasted warbler (Setophaga castanea)
- Blackburnian warbler (Setophaga fusca)
- Yellow warbler (Setophaga aestiva)
- Chestnut-sided warbler (Setophaga pensylvanica)
- Blackpoll warbler (Setophaga striata)
- Black-throated blue warbler (Setophaga caerulescens)
- Palm warbler (Setophaga palmarum)
- Yellow-rumped warbler (Setophaga coronata)
- Yellow-throated warbler (Setophaga dominica)
- Prairie warbler (Setophaga discolor)
- Black-throated green warbler (Setophaga virens)
- Pine warbler (Setophaga pinus) (A)
- Canada warbler (Cardellina canadensis) (A)
- Wilson's warbler (Cardellina pusilla) (A)

== Cardinals, grosbeaks, and allies ==
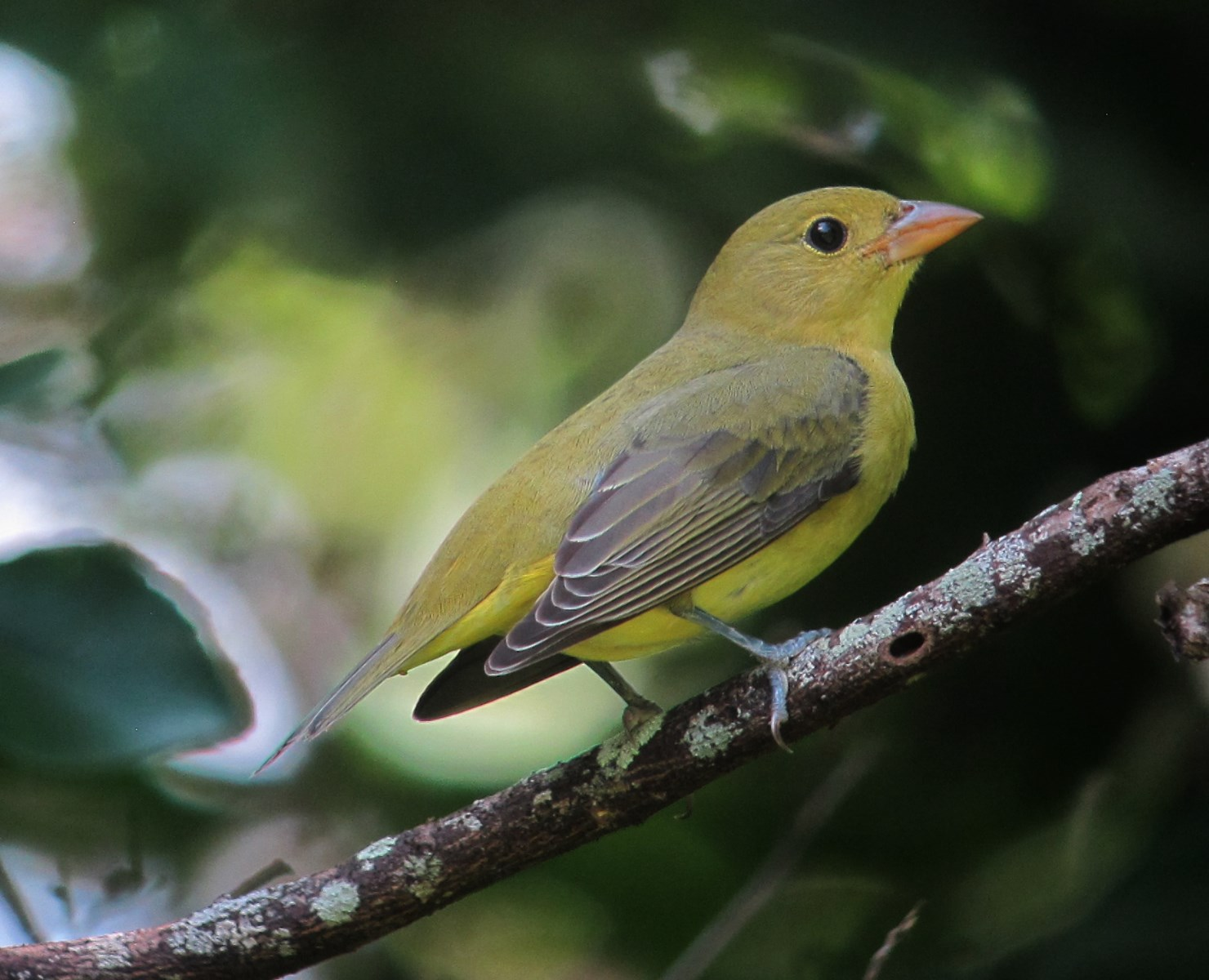
Scarlet tanager

Order: Passeriformes Family: Cardinalidae

- Summer tanager (Piranga rubra)
- Scarlet tanager (Piranga olivacea)
- Rose-breasted grosbeak (Pheucticus ludovicianus)
- Blue grosbeak (Passerina caerulea)
- Indigo bunting (Passerina cyanea)
- Painted bunting (Passerina ciris) (A)
- Dickcissel (Spiza americana)

== South American tanagers ==
Order: Passeriformes Family: Thraupidae

- Bananaquit (Coereba flaveola)
- Black-faced grassquit (Melanospiza bicolor)
