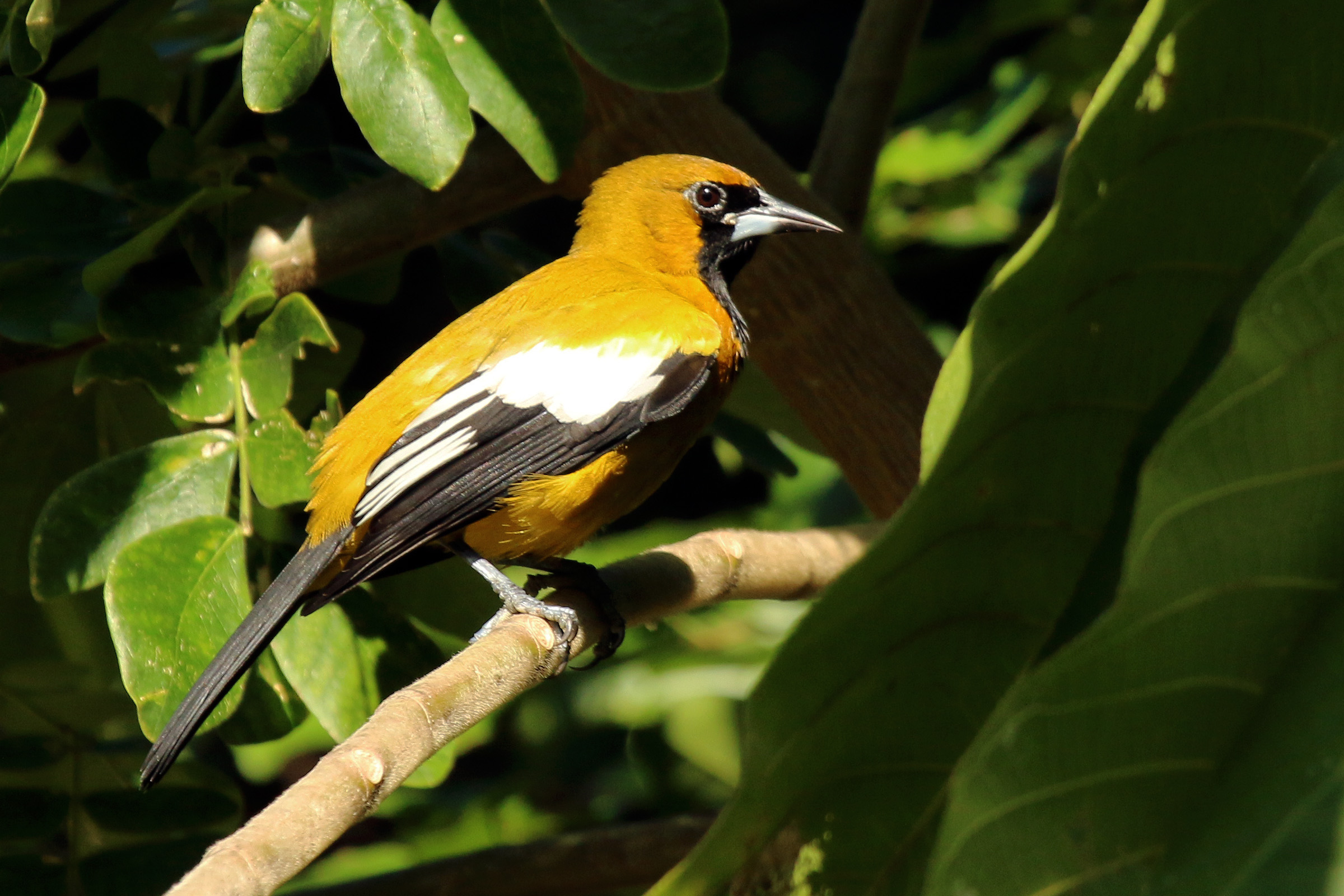
- At Green Castle Estate, Jamaica

Conservation status
- Least Concern (IUCN 3.1)

Scientific classification
- Kingdom: Animalia
- Phylum: Chordata
- Class: Aves
- Order: Passeriformes
- Family: Icteridae
- Genus: Icterus
- Species: I. leucopteryx

Binomial name
- Icterus leucopteryx (Wagler, 1827)

= Jamaican oriole =

Species of bird

The Jamaican oriole (Icterus leucopteryx) is a species of bird in the family Icteridae, the oropendolas, New World orioles, and New World blackbirds. It is found in Jamaica and on the Colombian island of San Andrés.

== Taxonomy and systematics ==
The Jamaican oriole was formally described in 1827 with the binomial Psarocolius Leucopteryx [sic]. It was later reassigned to its present genus Icterus that had been erected in 1760. Curiously, it is not closely related to the other Caribbean members of its genus. Its closest relatives appear to be the Mexican endemic orange oriole (I. auratus) and the yellow oriole (I. nigrogularis) of northern South America.

The Jamaican oriole has two extant subspecies, the nominate I. l. leucopteryx (Wagler, 1827) and I. l. lawrencii (Cory, 1887). A third subspecies, I. l. bairdi (Cory, 1886), was last recorded in 1967 and is considered extinct.

== Description ==
The Jamaican oriole is about 21 cm (8.3 in) long and weighs 34 to 42 g (1.2 to 1.5 oz). The sexes have the same plumage though females are somewhat duller than males. Adults of the nominate subspecies are mostly olivaceous yellow with a somewhat yellower belly. They have a black mask, throat, and upper breast. Their wings are mostly black with wide white edges on the inner flight feathers and white coverts; the last show as a large white patch on the folded wing. Their tail is black. Subspecies I. l. lawrencii is a brighter yellow-green than the nominate and has lemon-yellow underparts. Both subspecies have a dark brown iris, a bluish gray bill with a black culmen, and dark gray legs and feet.

== Distribution and habitat ==
The nominate subspecies of the Jamaican oriole is found on the island of Jamaica. Subspecies I. l. lawrencii is found on San Andrés Island, which is off the coast of Nicaragua despite being Colombian territory. Subspecies I. l. bairdi was found on Grand Cayman Island. On Jamaica the species inhabits all forest types except mangroves. It also inhabits woodlands, generally any treed area, and gardens. Though it is mostly a bird of the lowlands it occurs at all elevations. Its habitat associations on San Andrés have not been studied.

== Behavior ==
=== Movement ===
The Jamaican oriole is a year-round resident on both islands.

=== Feeding ===
The Jamaican oriole feeds primarily on insects and other arthropods, smaller amounts of fruit and nectar, and possibly small vertebrates. It feeds on both wild and cultivated fruits and takes nectar from flowers and hummingbird feeders. It often captures prey exposed by scaling off bark; it also finds it in epiphytic bromeliads. It forages in pairs and family groups.

=== Breeding ===
The Jamaican oriole breeds between March and August. It is a solitary breeder and is thought to be monogamous. The nest is a pouch or bag that both sexes weave from palm fibers, fungal rhizomorphs, and Spanish moss (Tillandsia). It is suspended between two twigs or in a fork. The clutch is three to five eggs that are white with a few dark brown markings. The incubation period and time to fledging are not known. Both parents provision nestlings. Nests are sometimes parasitized by shiny cowbirds (Molothrus bonariensis).

=== Vocalization ===
The Jamaican oriole's song is a "[w]histled you cheat or cheat-you". Other renditions are tie-tiewu and tie-tiewu-tiewu. The species' calls are "a single or 2-note whistle [and] a short chatter".

== Status ==
The IUCN has assessed the Jamaican oriole as being of Least Concern. Its population size is not known but is believed to be stable. No immediate threats have been identified. Both subspecies are considered common.
