= Icterus =

Icterus may refer to:

- Jaundice, also known as icterus, is a yellowish pigmentation of the skin
- Icterus (bird), the genus of the New World orioles
