= List of edible flowers =

This is a list of edible flowers.

Scientific name	Flavor	Color	Common name	Details
Abelmoschus esculentus	Vegetal	Medium-yellow	Okra	
Anthriscus cerefolium	Herbal	White	Chervil	
Asparagus officinalis	Vegetal	Green	Asparagus	
Bellis perennis	Mildly bitter	White	Daisy	
Borago officinalis	Anise	Lilac	Starflower	Diuretic if eaten in quantity
Brassica oleracea	Spicy	Green	Cabbage	
Bauhinia purpurea	Sour	Purple	Purple bauhinia, butterfly tree, orchid tree	
Calendula officinalis	Slightly bitter	Yellow, orange	Pot Marigold	
Centaurea cyanus	Vegetal	White, pink, blue	Cornflower	
Chrysanthemum	Strong	Wide range	Chrysanthemum	
Cichorium intybus	Herbal	Blue	Chicory	
Cucurbita pepo	Vegetal	Yellow	Squash, pumpkin, zucchini	
Curcuma nakhonphanomensis		White, yellow, orange, red		
Cymbopetalum costaricense	Spicy	White		
Cymbopetalum penduliflorum	Spicy	White	Sacred earflower	
Dianthus	Sweet clove	Wide range	Carnation	
Eruca sativa	Spicy	White	Arugula	
Foeniculum vulgare	Mildly anise	Yellow-green	Fennel	
Galium odoratum	Sweet, nutty, vanilla	White	Woodruff	
Helianthus annuus	Varies	Yellow	Sunflower	
Hemerocallis	Vegetal, sweet	Wide range	Daylily	Diuretic or laxative if eaten in quantity
Hibiscus rosa-sinensis	Cranberry-like	Rose, red	Chinese hibiscus	
Lavandula	Sweet, perfumed	Lavender	Lavender	
Levisticum officinale	Celery	White	Lovage	
Lonicera japonica	Sweet	White to pale yellow	Japanese honeysuckle	
Malus	Floral	White to pink	Apple	
Matricaria recutita	Sweet apple	White	Camomile	
Mentha	Minty	Purple	Mint	
Monarda didyma	Minty, sweet, hot	Wide range	Bergamot	
Musa spp.	Vegetal	White, yellow, pink	Banana blossom	
Ocimum basilicum	Herbal	White, lavender	Basil	
Passiflora	Vegetal	Purple	Passion flower	
Pelargonium	Varies	Wide range	Geranium	
Phaseolus vulgaris	Vegetal	Purple	Common bean	
Phalaenopsis	Watery	Varies	Moth orchid	
Rosa	Perfumed	Wide range	Rose	
Rosmarinus officinalis	Herbal	Blue	Rosemary	
Salvia elegans	Sweet, fruity	Red	Pineapple sage	
Salvia officinalis	Herbal	Purple-blue	Common sage	
Sambucus canadensis	Sweet	White	American elderberry	
Sesbania grandiflora	Vegetable-like	White	West-Indian pea	
Syringa vulgaris	Varies	Lavender	Lilac	
Tagetes patula	Bitter	Yellow, orange	French marigold	
Tagetes tenuifolia	Spicy, herbal	Yellow	Signet marigold	
Taraxacum officinale	Sweet, honey-like	Yellow	Common dandelion	
Thymus	Herbal	White	Thyme	
Tilia	Honey-like	White	Linden	
Trifolium pratense	Sweet	Red	Red clover	
Tropaeolum majus	Spicy, peppery	Wide range	Garden nasturtium, Indian cress, monks cress	
Tulipa	Vegetal	Wide range	Tulip	
Viola odorata	Sweet, perfumed	Purple, white	Sweet violet	
Viola tricolor	Wintergreen	Purple and yellow	Heart's ease	
Viola × wittrockiana	Vegetal	Wide range	Pansy	

== See also ==
- List of culinary herbs and spices
- List of edible nuts
- Lists of useful plants
