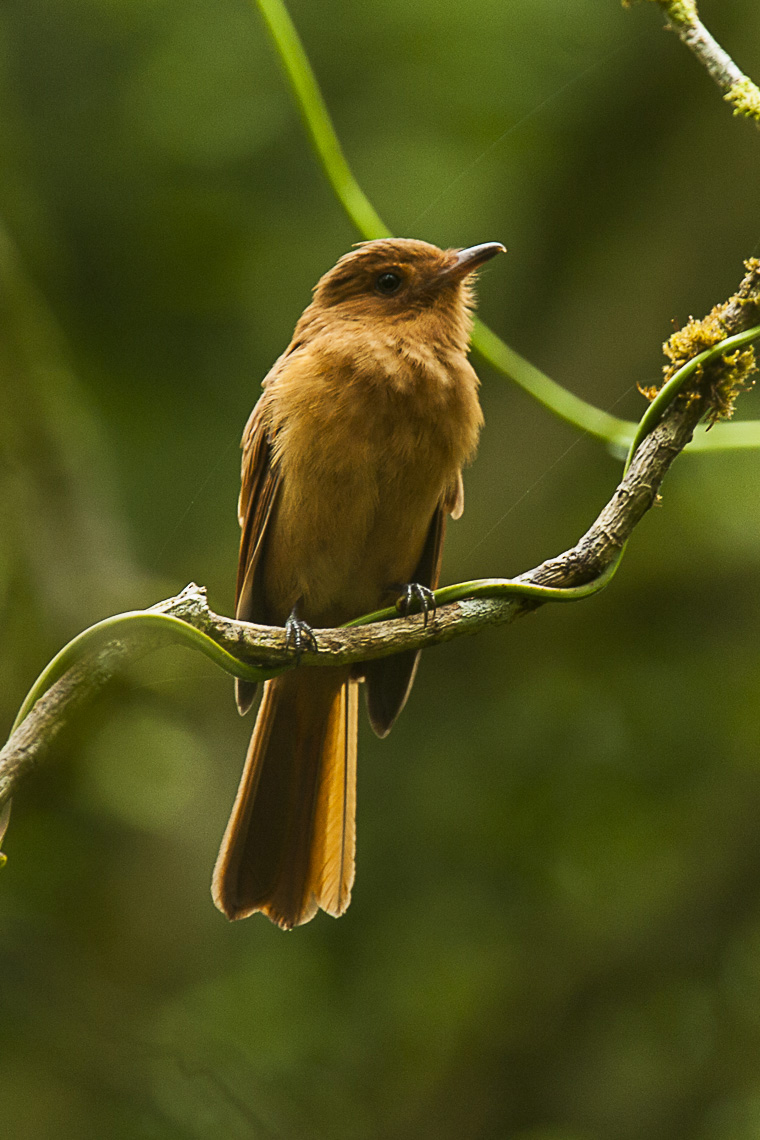

Conservation status
- Least Concern (IUCN 3.1)

Scientific classification
- Kingdom: Animalia
- Phylum: Chordata
- Class: Aves
- Order: Passeriformes
- Family: Tyrannidae
- Genus: Rhytipterna
- Species: R. holerythra

Binomial name
- Rhytipterna holerythra (Sclater, PL & Salvin, 1860)

= Rufous mourner =

Species of bird

The rufous mourner (Rhytipterna holerythra) is a passerine bird in the family Tyrannidae, the tyrant flycatchers. It is found in Mexico, every Central American country except El Salvador, Colombia, and Ecuador.

== Taxonomy and systematics ==
The rufous mourner was originally described as Lipaugus holerythrus, mistakenly grouping it with the cotingas. It was later transferred to genus Rhytipterna that had been erected in 1850. Rhytipterna was also treated as a cotinga genus but a series of studies published beginning in the 1960s resulted in its movement to the tyrant flycatcher family. The rufous mourner shares the genus with the pale-bellied mourner (R. immunda) and grayish mourner (R. simplex). The rufous and greyish mourners apparently form a superspecies.

The rufous mourner has two subspecies, the nominate R. h. holerythra (Sclater, PL & Salvin, 1860) and R. h. rosenbergi (Hartert, EJO, 1905).

== Description ==
The rufous mourner is 19.5 to 21 cm (7.7 to 8.3 in) long and weighs about 32 to 39 g (1.1 to 1.4 oz). The sexes have the same plumage. Males of the nominate subspecies have a mostly cinnamon brown to russet head and upperparts with a darker rufous crown. Their wings are a darker brown than the back with cinnamon rufous edges on the flight feathers. Their tail is mostly cinnamon rufous with darker central feathers. Their underparts are bright cinnamon to tawny ochraceous that is lighter on the throat and belly and darker on the breast. Juveniles have brighter, more rufous upperparts and paler cinnamon buff underparts than adults. Subspecies R. h. rosenbergi is similar to the nominate but more deeply colored on both the upper- and underparts. Both subspecies have a light brown to reddish brown iris, a slightly hooked black bill with a dusky brown base to the maxilla and a variable pale base to the mandible, and gray to black legs and feet.

== Distribution and habitat ==
The nominate subspecies of the rufous mourner is the more northerly of the two. It is found on the Gulf-Caribbean slope from Oaxaca in southern Mexico (except the Yucatán Peninsula) south through southern Belize, northern Guatemala, Honduras, Nicaragua, and Costa Rica. It also is found on the Pacific slope from central Costa Rica south, on both slopes through Panama, and across north-central Colombia. Subspecies R. h. rosenbergi is found on the Pacific slope from southern Chocó Department in northwestern Colombia south into Ecuador as far as Pichincha Province, with scattered records further south.

The rufous mourner inhabits humid evergreen forest and mature secondary forest in the lowlands of the tropical and lower subtropical zones. In elevation it ranges from sea level to 1,200 m (3,900 ft) in northern Central America and Costa Rica. It is found up to 1,400 m (4,600 ft) in Colombia but only as high as 700 m (2,300 ft) in Ecuador.

== Behavior ==
=== Movement ===
The rufous mourner is a year-round resident.

=== Feeding ===
The rufous mourner primarily feeds on large insects and spiders and also includes some fruit in its diet. It is known to take insects of the families Tettigoniidae, Cicadidae, Membracidae, Formicidae, and Phasmatidae and members of the orders Coleoptera and Lepidoptera. Fruits taken include those of genera Alchornea, Casearia, Bursera, Cymbopetalum, and Guarea. The rufous mourner forages singly or in pairs and often joins mixed-species feeding flocks. It perches on a branch, sometimes almost horizontally, usually in the forest's mid-story, and sallies from there to glean prey from the underside of vegetation while briefly hovering.

=== Breeding ===
The rufous mourner's breeding season has not been defined but includes March to May in Belize, March to June in Costa Rica, and February to May in Colombia. They apparently mostly nest in tree cavities such as old woodpecker holes. They perhaps also nest in holes in earthen banks but that account has been disputed.

=== Vocalization ===
The rufous mourner is not highly vocal. Its song is "a steady, rich, slightly plaintive...wheeo-wheeo-wheeo-weeo-weeo-weeo-wheee. Its call is "an extended, mournful 'wolf-whistle' that rises and then falls in pitch, described variously as right here or wheeip, wheeeer or wheeeu peeeu or whi heeeu."

== Status ==
The IUCN has assessed the rufous mourner as being of Least Concern. It has a large range; its estimated population of at least 50,000 mature individuals is believed to be decreasing. No immediate threats have been identified. It is considered "uncommon to fairly common" in northern Central America, "fairly common" in Costa Rica, and "uncommon and inconspicuous" in Colombia. "Rufous Mourner is dependent on threatened tropical lowland evergreen forest habitats. It nests in cavities, and as such requires large stands of humid evergreen rainforest. The primary threats to this species are logging of mature forests, and conversion of forest land to agriculture."
