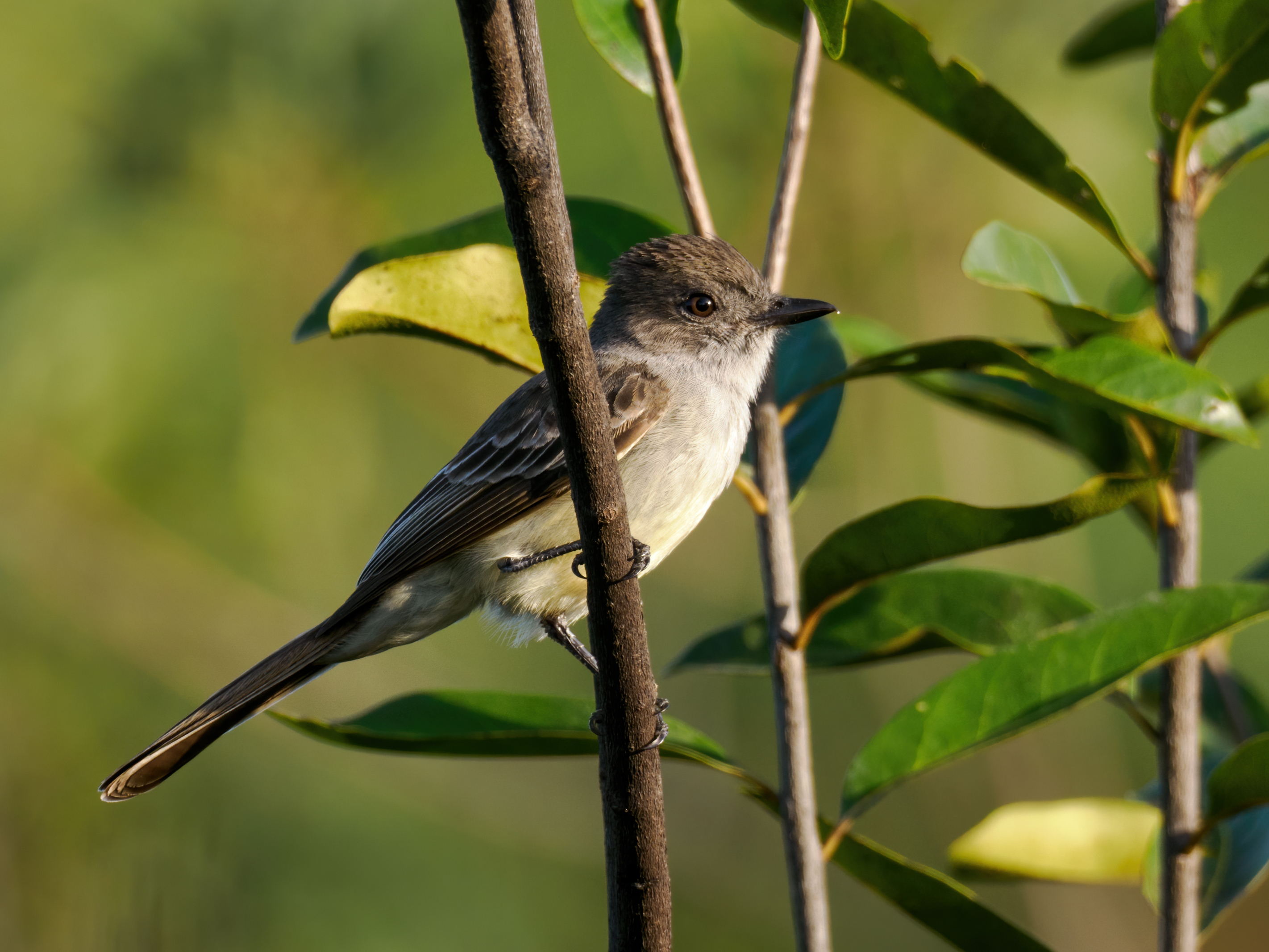

Conservation status
- Least Concern (IUCN 3.1)

Scientific classification
- Kingdom: Animalia
- Phylum: Chordata
- Class: Aves
- Order: Passeriformes
- Family: Tyrannidae
- Genus: Rhytipterna
- Species: R. immunda

Binomial name
- Rhytipterna immunda (Sclater, PL & Salvin, 1873)

= Pale-bellied mourner =

Species of bird

The pale-bellied mourner (Rhytipterna immunda) is a species of bird in the family Tyrannidae, the tyrant flycatchers. It is found in Bolivia, Brazil, Colombia, Guyana, Suriname, Venezuela, and possibly French Guiana.

== Taxonomy and systematics ==
The pale-bellied mourner was originally described as Lipaugus immundus, mistakenly grouping it with the cotingas. It was later transferred to genus Rhytipterna that had been erected in 1850. It shares that genus with the greyish mourner (R. simplex) and rufous mourner (R. holerythra). There is evidence that the pale-bellied mourner does not belong in that genus but possibly belongs in genus Myiarchus.

The pale-bellied mourner is monotypic.

== Description ==
The pale-bellied mourner is 18.5 to 19 cm (7.3 to 7.5 in) long and weighs about 28 g (0.99 oz). The sexes have the same plumage. Adults have a mostly dull grayish olive-brown head and upperparts with a slightly darker crown and browner uppertail coverts. Their wings are duskier olive-brown with two faint wing bars and rufous edges on the primaries. Their tail is browner than the upperparts with rufous edges on all the feathers except the outermost pair, which have paler edges. Their throat and underparts are mostly grayish with a pale dingy yellowish belly and a rusty tinge on the flanks. They have a dark brown iris, a slightly hooked blackish bill with prominent rictal bristles, and blackish legs and feet.

== Distribution and habitat ==
The pale-bellied mourner has a highly disjunct distribution, with one large range and at least two smaller ones. The largest extends from extreme eastern Colombia southeast through southern Venezuela into northwestern Brazil along the Rio Negro basin to its confluence with the Amazon. From there it extends south to Rondônia and extreme northern Bolivia and thence east to Mato Grosso. It has a small, apparently isolated, population further east in Tocantins. The species occupies a small range in southern Guyana and another extends east from northeastern Suriname to northern Amapá in extreme northern Brazil. However, the South American Classification Committee of the American Ornithological Society has no documented records from the middle of that range in French Guiana and so classes the species as hypothetical in that country.

The pale-bellied mourner inhabits a variety of somewhat open landscapes including savanna woodlands (especially those on sandy soil), scrubby low várzea woodlands, and campina. In elevation it is found below 300 m (1,000 ft) in Brazil and Venezuela and below 250 m (800 ft) in Colombia.

== Behavior ==
=== Movement ===
The pale-bellied mourner is a year-round resident.

=== Feeding ===
The pale-bellied mourner's diet is not well known but includes insects and fruit. It feeds with sallies from a perch to glean from foliage while briefly hovering. It sometimes forages with mixed-species feeding flocks.

=== Breeding ===
Nothing is known about the pale-bellied mourner's breeding biology.

=== Vocalization ===
The pale-bellied mourner's song is "2 well-separated Réet-je notes" whose Réet is much higher than the je. Its most common call is "a distinctive pur-treeép, cheeeuu or puu-puu-trreeép, cheeeuu" that has a loud ringing quality.

== Status ==
The IUCN has assessed the pale-bellied mourner as being of Least Concern. It has a large range; its population size is not known and is believed to be stable. No immediate threats have been identified. It is considered uncommon in Brazil, "local" in Colombia, and "uncommon to locally fairly common" in Venezuela. It occurs in some protected areas. "The white-sand savanna-like habitat occupied by this species is widespread, and has so far been protected from human exploitation because the soils do not support agriculture."
