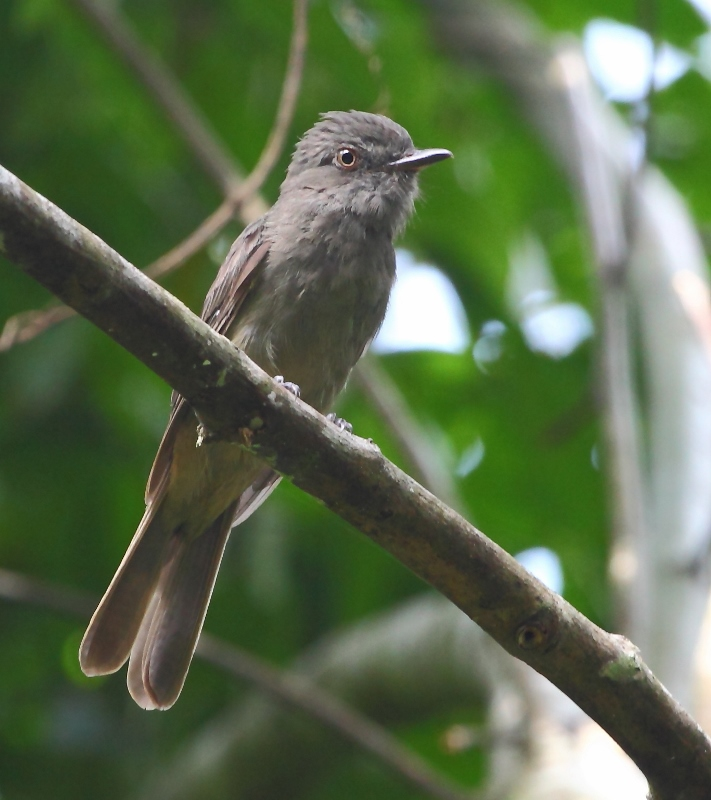
- At Restinga State Park, Bertioga, São Paulo State, Brazil

Conservation status
- Least Concern (IUCN 3.1)

Scientific classification
- Kingdom: Animalia
- Phylum: Chordata
- Class: Aves
- Order: Passeriformes
- Family: Tyrannidae
- Genus: Rhytipterna
- Species: R. simplex

Binomial name
- Rhytipterna simplex (Lichtenstein, MHC, 1823)

Synonyms
- M[uscicapa] simplex (protonym)

= Greyish mourner =

Species of bird

The greyish mourner (Rhytipterna simplex) is a species of bird in the family Tyrannidae, the tyrant flycatchers. It is found in every mainland South American country except Argentina, Chile, Paraguay, and Uruguay.

== Taxonomy and systematics ==
The greyish mourner was originally described as Muscicapa simplex, mistakenly placing it with the Old World flycatchers. It was later transferred to genus Rhytipterna that had been erected in 1850. It shares that genus with the pale-bellied mourner (R. immunda) and rufous mourner (R. holerythra). The greyish and rufous mourners apparently form a superspecies.

The greyish mourner has two subspecies, the nominate R. s. simplex (Lichtenstein, MHC, 1823) and R. s. frederici (Bangs & Penard, TE, 1918).

== Description ==
The greyish mourner is 19.5 to 20.5 cm (7.7 to 8.1 in) long and weighs 33 to 38 g (1.2 to 1.3 oz). Males of the nominate subspecies have a gray head with a hint of a crest at the rear of the crown. Their upperparts, wings, and tail are gray with a tinge of brown on the wings and tail. Their throat is light gray and their underparts slightly darker gray but lighter than the upperparts; their belly has a slight yellowish green tinge. Females are very similar with the addition of fulvous edges on the wing and tail feathers. Subspecies R. s. frederici is almost the same as the nominate but is darker overall. Both subspecies have a dark red to reddish brown iris, a slightly hooked black bill that is often pink at the base, and black legs and feet.

== Distribution and habitat ==
The greyish mourner has a disjunct distribution. The nominate subspecies is found in eastern Brazil from Alagoas south to eastern Minas Gerais and southwestern São Paulo. Subspecies R. s. frederici is found much more widely, from southeastern Colombia south through eastern Ecuador and eastern Peru into northwestern Bolivia and east through southern and eastern Venezuela, the Guianas, and Amazonian Brazil with the eastern edge roughly bounded by Mato Grosso, northern Goiás, and northern Maranhão. The species primarily inhabits the mid-story to upper story of humid terra firme forest and occasionally the transition zone between it and other forest types. In Brazil it is mostly found from sea level to 800 m (2,600 ft) and sometimes higher. It Colombia and Ecuador it reaches 700 m (2,300 ft), in Peru 1,400 m (4,600 ft), and in Venezuela 1,300 m (4,300 ft).

== Behavior ==
=== Movement ===
The greyish mourner is a year-round resident.

=== Feeding ===
The greyish mourner primarily feeds on large insects and also includes some fruit in its diet. It typically forages singly or in pairs and regularly joins mixed-species feeding flocks. It perches upright on an exposed branch and sallies from there to glean prey and fruit from vegetation while briefly hovering.

=== Breeding ===
The greyish mourner's breeding season has not been fully defined but spans August to November in Peru. Nothing else is known about the species' breeding biology.

=== Vocalization ===
The greyish mourner's song is "varied, [especially] in tempo; normally a rising series of sharp ih notes, ending in some loud, explosive Itch notes". The notes may be separate, repeated as a rattle, or decelerating, and sometimes the last note is omitted. It also makes "a slowly ascending series of clear, whistled whew notes".

== Status ==
The IUCN has assessed the greyish mourner as being of Least Concern. It has a very large range; its population size is not known and is believed to be decreasing. No immediate threats have been identified. It is considered common in Brazil and fairly common in Colombia, Peru, and Venezuela. It occurs in many protected areas both public and private, and "[g]iven that much of its habitat remains in relatively pristine condition within its large range, it is not likely to be at any risk". However, much of its habitat in eastern Brazil has been destroyed so the status of the nominate subspecies "requires investigation".
