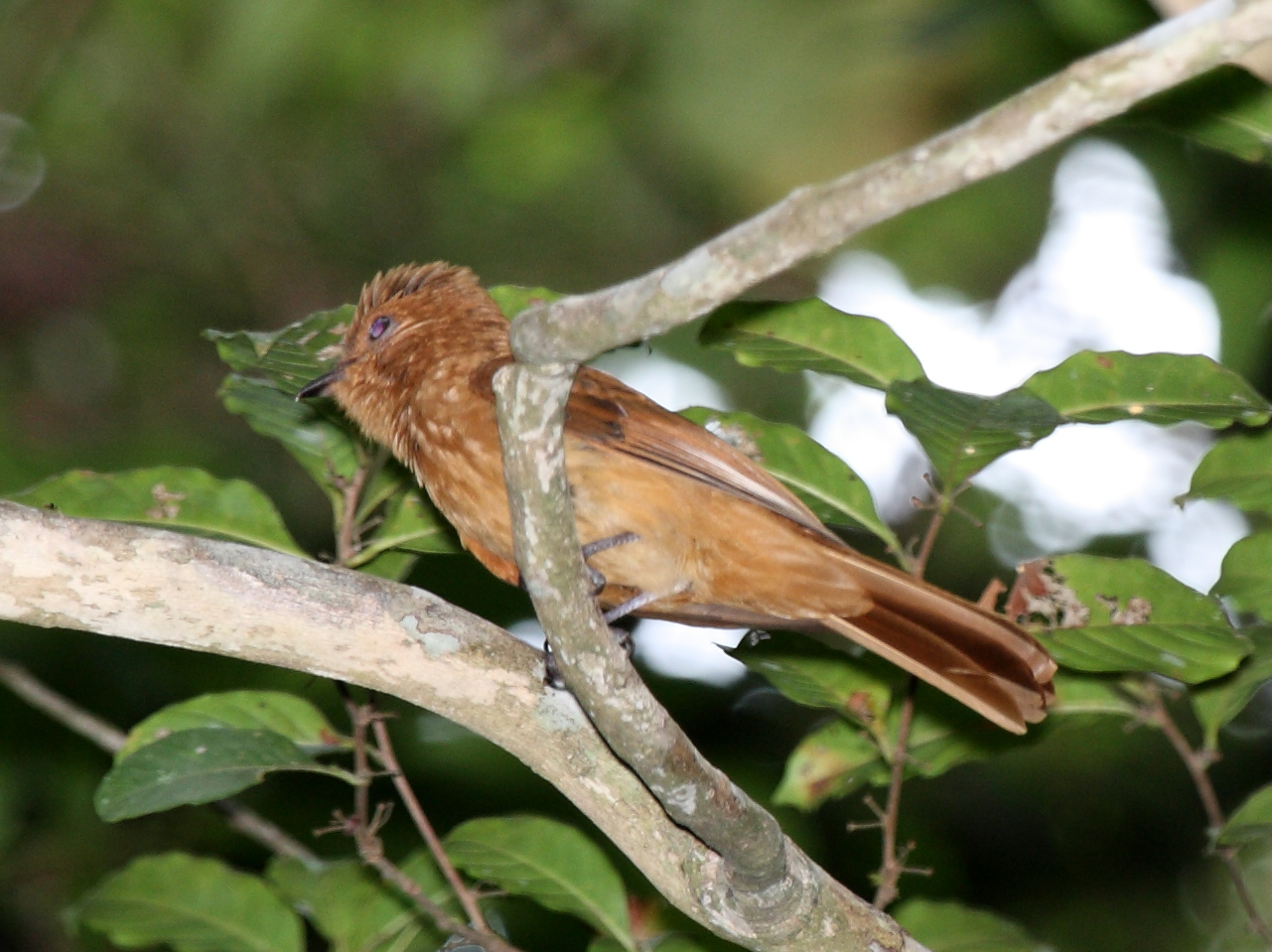
- Rufous mourner (Rhytipterna holerythra)

Scientific classification
- Kingdom: Animalia
- Phylum: Chordata
- Class: Aves
- Order: Passeriformes
- Family: Tyrannidae
- Genus: Rhytipterna; Reichenbach, 1850

Type species
- Tyrannus calcaratus = Rhytipterna simplex Swainson, 1837

= Rhytipterna =

Genus of birds

Rhytipterna is a genus of bird in the tyrant flycatcher family Tyrannidae. They share the common name "mourner" with several species in the family Tityridae.

The genus contains three species:

| Image | Scientific name | Common name | Distribution |
|---|---|---|---|
| | Rhytipterna immunda | Pale-bellied mourner | Brazil, Colombia, French Guiana, Suriname, and Venezuela |
| | Rhytipterna simplex | Greyish mourner | Bolivia, Brazil, Colombia, Ecuador, French Guiana, Guyana, Peru, Suriname, and Venezuela |
| | Rhytipterna holerythra | Rufous mourner | southwestern Mexico to northwestern Ecuador. |
