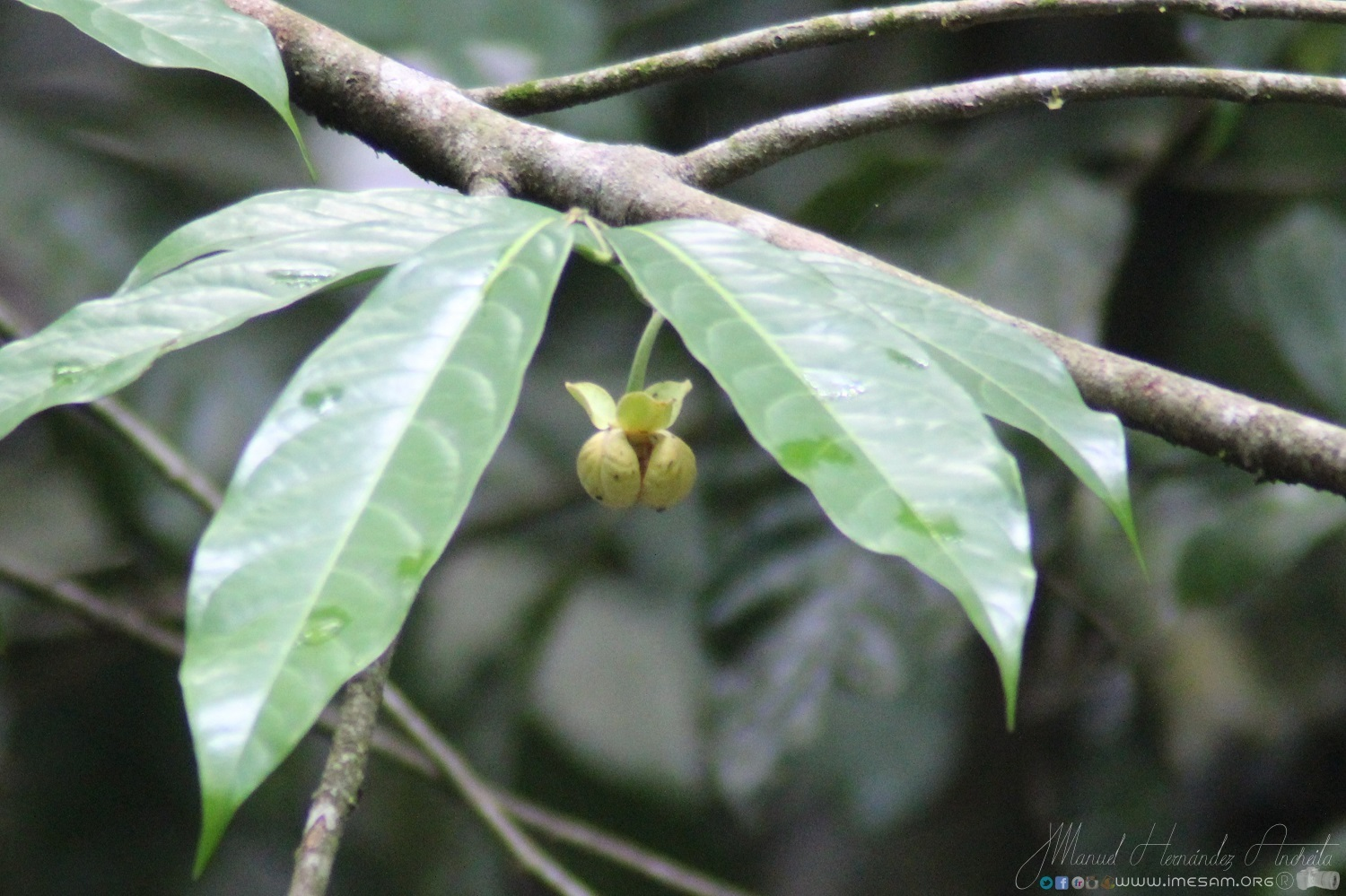
- leaves and a young flower of Cymbopetalum penduliflorum
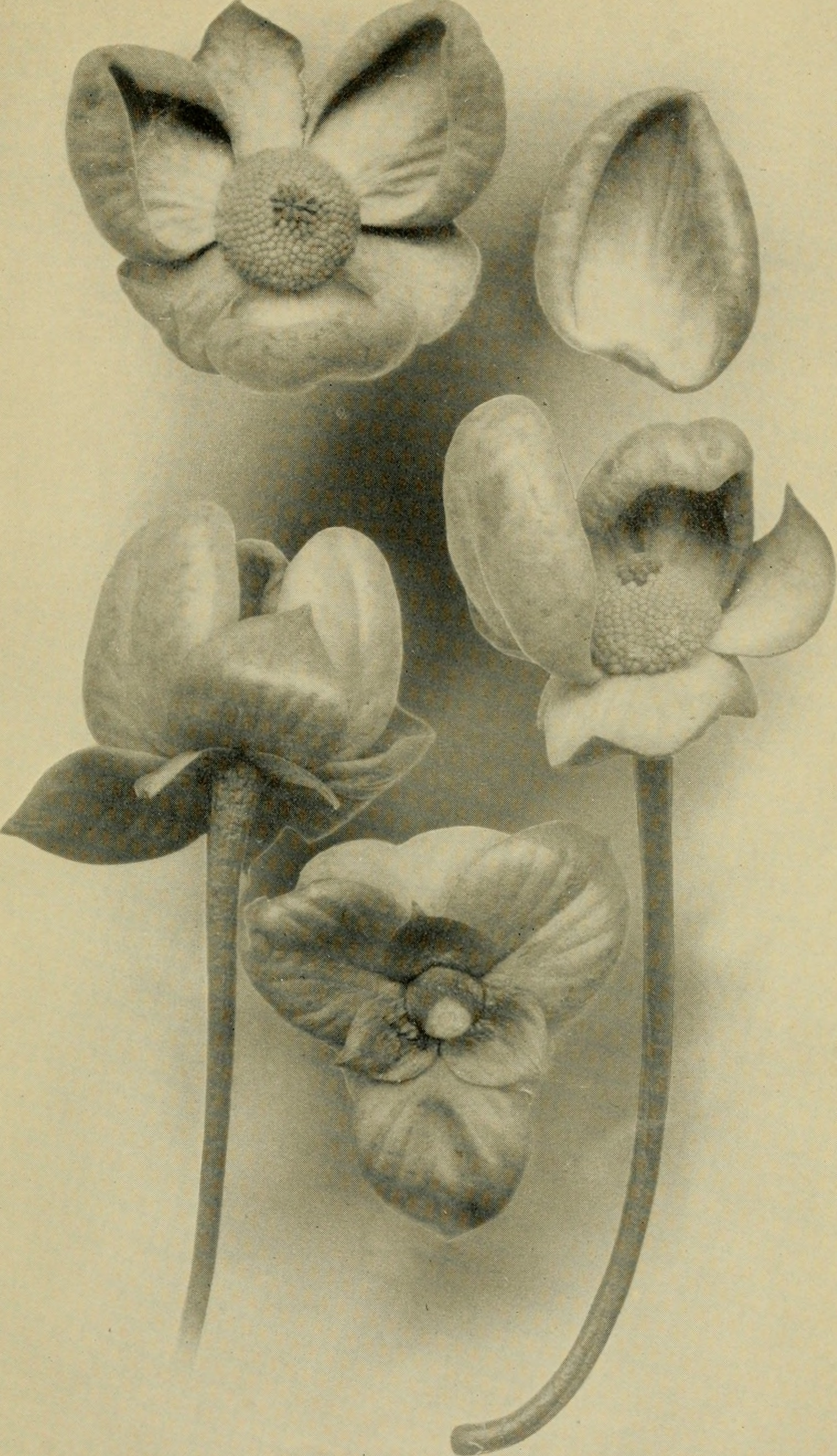
- Cymbopetalum penduliflorum flowers

Conservation status
- Least Concern (IUCN 3.1)

Scientific classification
- Kingdom: Plantae
- Clade: Embryophytes
- Clade: Tracheophytes
- Clade: Spermatophytes
- Clade: Angiosperms
- Clade: Magnoliids
- Order: Magnoliales
- Family: Annonaceae
- Genus: Cymbopetalum
- Species: C. penduliflorum

Binomial name
- Cymbopetalum penduliflorum (Sessé & Moç. ex Dunal) Baill. (1868)

Synonyms
- Porcelia cinnamomea Ruiz & Pav. ex G.Don; Unona penduliflora Sessé & Moç. ex Dunal (1817)

= Cymbopetalum penduliflorum =

Species of flowering plant

Cymbopetalum penduliflorum is a species of flowering plant in family Annonaceae. It is a tree native to central and southern Mexico, Guatemala, El Salvador, and Honduras.

== Description ==
The plant grows as a tree or small shrub with distichous, subsessile, oblanceolate leaves. It has solitary flowers borne on long slender peduncles coming from the internodes of the smaller branches. Its sepals are broadly ovate or suborbicular, cuspidate, reflexed at length, The outer petals are similar, but are much larger than the sepals. The inner petals are thick and fleshy with an involute margin that causes them to resemble a human ear. When fresh, the pungent flowers are greenish-yellow with the inner surface of the inner petals tending towards orange, at length turning brownish-purple or maroon, breaking with a bright orange fracture.

== Distribution and habitat ==
It is native to mountainous areas of central and southern Mexico, Guatemala, El Salvador. and Honduras. It is still cultivated as a spice in the Guatemalan regions around Cobán and Jacaltenango and sold in markets in those areas as well as Antigua Guatemala, Santa Ana, El Salvador, and San Andrés Tuxtla, Mexico.

== Uses ==
The dried flowers of C. penduliflorum and related species C. costaricense were traditionally used to give a spicy flavor to chocolate before the arrival of cinnamon and the other Old World spices. The dried petals are still used in atoles, pinoles, and coffee.

== In culture ==
Common names include sacred earflower. In Spanish the plant is called flor de la oreja or orejuela, and in Nahuatl it is called xochinacaztli. In the Guatemalan municipality of Todos Santos Cuchumatán it is called tzchiquin itz in the Mam language. It is called muc' by the Qʼeqchiʼ in the area of Cobán.
