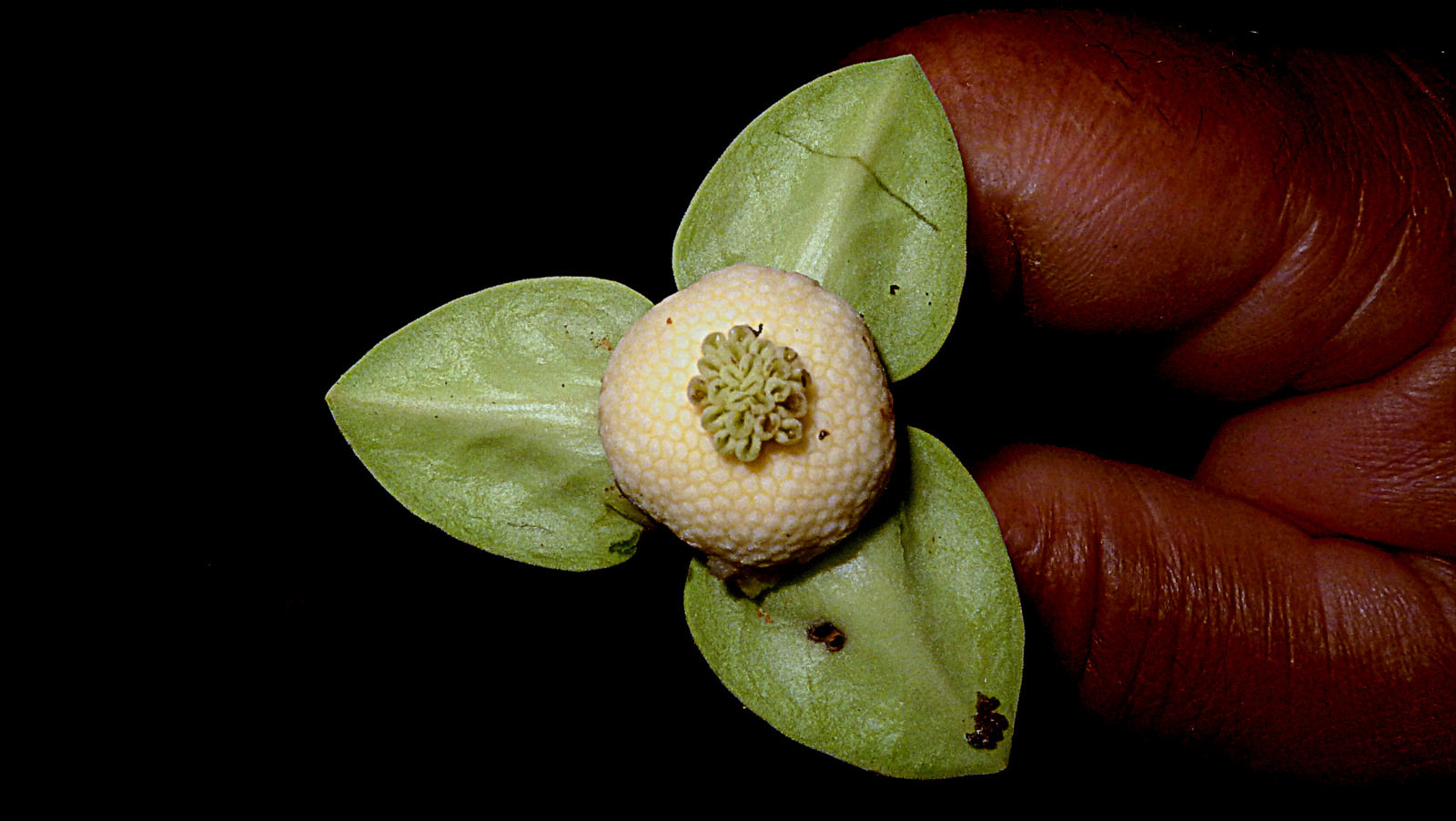
- flower of C. brasiliense

Scientific classification
- Kingdom: Plantae
- Clade: Tracheophytes
- Clade: Angiosperms
- Clade: Magnoliids
- Order: Magnoliales
- Family: Annonaceae
- Genus: Cymbopetalum; Benth.

Species
- see text

= Cymbopetalum =

Genus of flowering plants

Cymbopetalum is a genus of plant in family Annonaceae. The generic name derives from the Latin words cymba, meaning 'boat', and petalum, meaning 'petal'.

== Description ==
Plants in this genus are shrubs or small trees. The flowers are solitary with three sepals and six petals, appearing on the plant as single flowers in the leaf axils. The petals are arranged in two whorls of three, with the outer petals smaller than the inner ones. They have numerous stamens and carpels.

== Uses ==
Some species such as C. penduliflorum and C. costaricense were traditionally used to flavor chocolate.

== Species ==
As of September 2025, Plants of the World Online accepts the following 27 species:

- Cymbopetalum abacophyllum N.A.Murray
- Cymbopetalum aequale N.A.Murray
- Cymbopetalum alkekengi N.A.Murray
- Cymbopetalum baillonii R.E.Fr.
- Cymbopetalum brasiliense (Vell.) Benth. ex Baill.
- Cymbopetalum coriaceum N.A.Murray
- Cymbopetalum costaricense (Donn.Sm.) R.E.Fr.
- Cymbopetalum euneurum N.A.Murray
- Cymbopetalum fosteri N.A.Murray
- Cymbopetalum gracile R.E.Fr.
- Cymbopetalum hintonii Lundell
- Cymbopetalum lanugipetalum Schery
- Cymbopetalum longipes Benth. ex Diels
- Cymbopetalum loretoyacuense N.A.Murray
- Cymbopetalum mayanum Lundell
- Cymbopetalum mirabile R.E.Fr.
- Cymbopetalum oppositiflorum Aristeg. ex N.A.Murray
- Cymbopetalum parviflorum N.A.Murray
- Cymbopetalum penduliflorum (Dunal) Baill.
- Cymbopetalum physaloides N.A.Murray
- Cymbopetalum rugulosum N.A.Murray
- Cymbopetalum sanchezii N.A.Murray
- Cymbopetalum schunkei N.A.Murray
- Cymbopetalum stenophyllum Donn.Sm.
- Cymbopetalum steyermarkii N.A.Murray
- Cymbopetalum tessmannii R.E.Fr.
- Cymbopetalum torulosum G.E.Schatz
