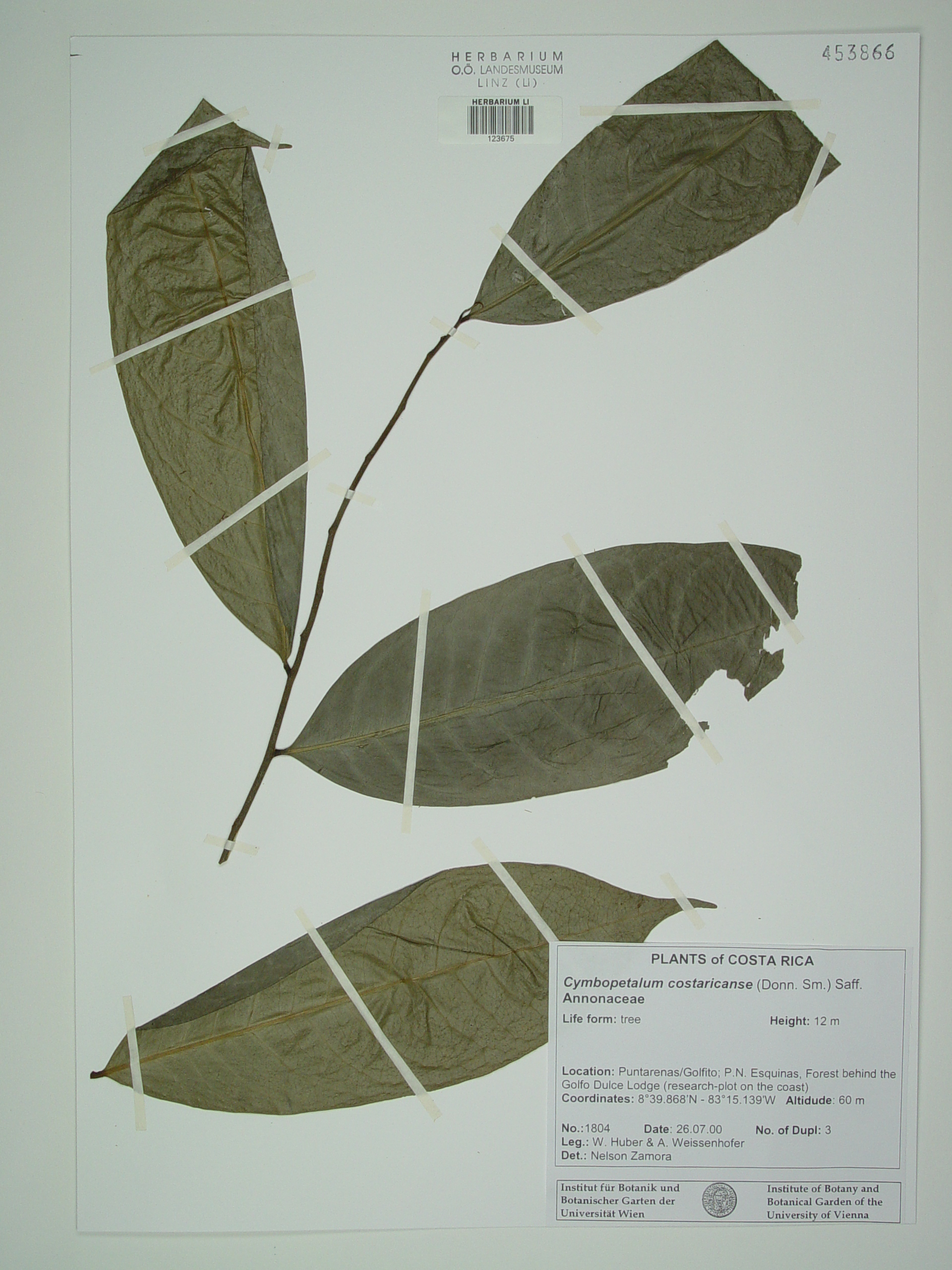
- Pressed leaves of Cymbopetalum costaricense

Conservation status
- Least Concern (IUCN 3.1)

Scientific classification
- Kingdom: Plantae
- Clade: Tracheophytes
- Clade: Angiosperms
- Clade: Magnoliids
- Order: Magnoliales
- Family: Annonaceae
- Genus: Cymbopetalum
- Species: C. costaricense

Binomial name
- Cymbopetalum costaricense (Donn.Sm.) R.E.Fr.

Synonyms
- Asimina costaricensis Donn.Sm.

= Cymbopetalum costaricense =

Species of flowering plant

Cymbopetalum costaricense is a species of flowering plant in the family Annonaceae. It is a shrub or tree native to Honduras, Nicaragua, Costa Rica, and Panama in Central America, where it grows in lowland rain forest. The specific epithet refers to the country of Costa Rica which is in the plant's range.

The flowers of Cymbopetalum costaricense and related species C. penduliflorum are traditionally used by indigenous peoples to flavor chocolate.
