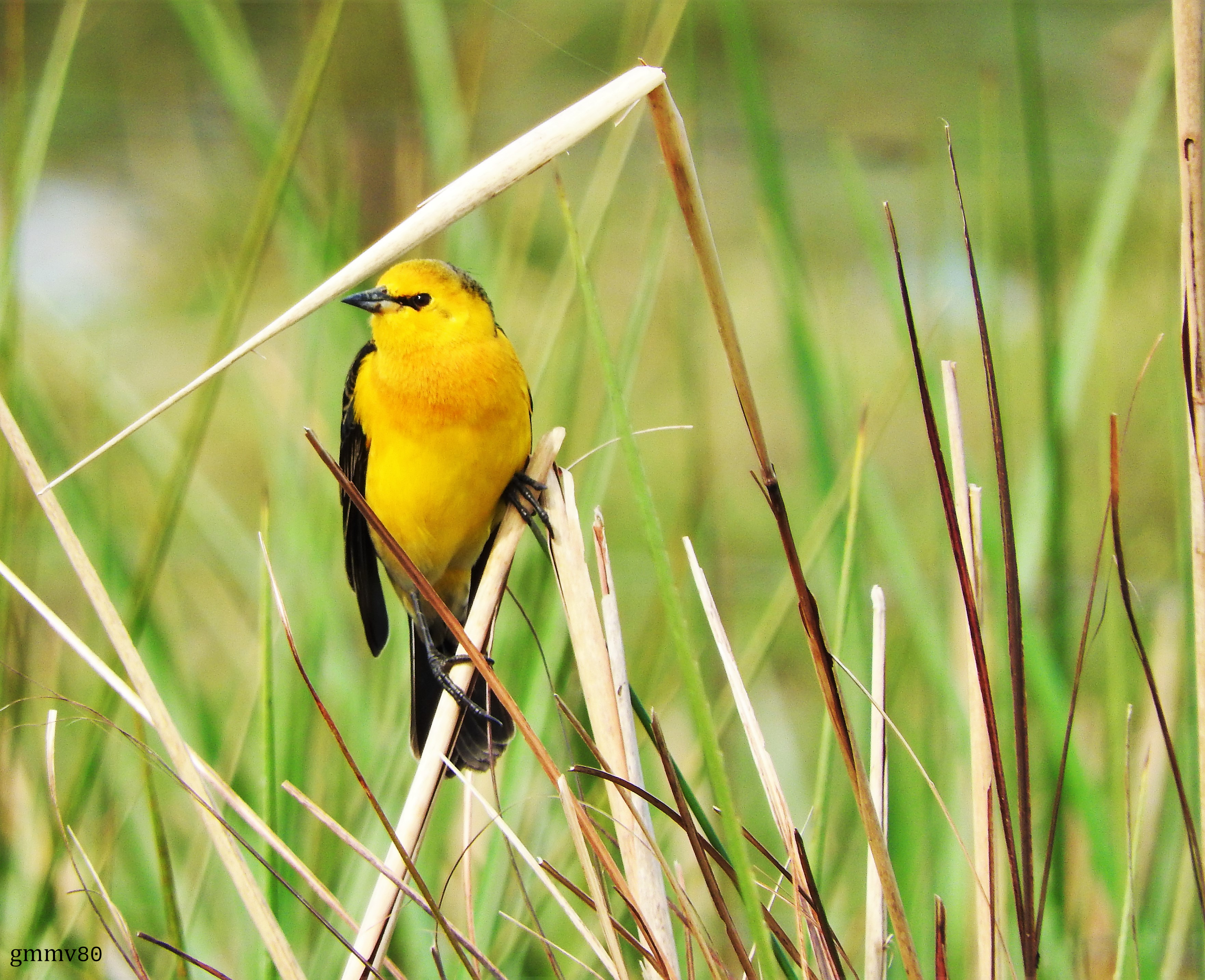

Conservation status
- Endangered (IUCN 3.1)
- CITES Appendix I

Scientific classification
- Kingdom: Animalia
- Phylum: Chordata
- Class: Aves
- Order: Passeriformes
- Family: Icteridae
- Genus: Xanthopsar; Ridgway, 1901
- Species: X. flavus

Binomial name
- Xanthopsar flavus (Gmelin, JF, 1788)

Synonyms
- See text

= Saffron-cowled blackbird =

Species of bird

The saffron-cowled blackbird (Xanthopsar flavus) is an endangered species of bird in the family Icteridae, the oropendolas, New World orioles, and New World blackbirds. It is found in Argentina, Brazil, Paraguay, and Uruguay.

== Taxonomy and systematics ==
The saffron-cowled blackbird was formally described in 1788 by the German naturalist Johann Friedrich Gmelin in his revised and expanded edition of Carl Linnaeus's Systema Naturae. He placed it with the orioles in the genus Oriolus and coined the binomial Oriolus flavus. Gmelin based his account on the "Troupiale jaune d'Antigue" that had been described and illustrated in 1776 by the French naturalist Pierre Sonnerat in his book Voyage à la Nouvelle Guinée. There was confusion over the origin of Sonnerat's specimen, but in 1937 Austrian ornithologist Carl Hellmayr designated Río de la Plata as the type locality. In 1901 American ornithologist Robert Ridgway erected genus Xanthopsar with the saffron-cowled blackbird as its type species. That genus name combines the Ancient Greek xanthos meaning "yellow" with psar meaning "starling". The specific epithet flavus is Latin meaning "yellow". In the last quarter of the twentieth century some authors merged Xanthopsar into genus Agelaius but the change was not widely accepted. Molecular genetic studies have shown that the saffron-cowled blackbird is closely related to the two marshbirds in the genus Pseudoleistes.

The saffron-cowled blackbird is the only member of its genus and has no subspecies.

== Description ==
The saffron-cowled blackbird averages 20 cm (7.9 in) long. Males weigh an average of 42.5 g (1.5 oz) and females average 39.3 g (1.4 oz). The species is sexually dimorphic. Adult males have black lores and a black hindcrown, nape, back, and tail. The rest of their head, their rump, and most of their underparts are yellow with a tinge of orange on the forehead and breast. Their undertail coverts are black with yellow tips and their thighs are black. Their wings are mostly black with yellow marginal and lesser upperwing coverts that form an epaulet. Adult females have a brownish gray stripe through the eye and brownish gray crown, nape, back, wings, and tail. The rest of their plumage is yellow that is palest on the belly. Both sexes have an orange-brown to deep red-brown iris, a black bill, and black legs and feet. Juveniles are similar to adult females but with a lemon-yellow rump.

== Distribution and habitat ==
The saffron-cowled blackbird is found in southeastern Paraguay, far southern Brazil's Santa Catarina and Rio Grande do Sul states, eastern Uruguay, and northeastern Argentina's Corrientes and Entre Rios provinces. It formerly was found from southern Paraguay south through Argentina well into Buenos Aires Province. It inhabits a mosaic landscape of marshes, wet grasslands, bogs, pastures, and agricultural fields such as of rice. In some areas it uses such habitats surrounded by subtropical forest or bamboo. In elevation it ranges from sea level to about 1,000 m (3,300 ft).

== Behavior ==
=== Movement ===
The saffron-cowled blackbird is generally a year-round resident though it does make some local movements.

=== Feeding ===
The saffron-cowled blackbird feeds primarily on insects and spiders and on lesser numbers of small vertebrates such as frogs. Seeds, both wild and cultivated, are a very minor part of its diet. It forages on the ground in flocks that "roll" across the landscape. It probes soil, plucks prey from grass and low vegetation, and also captures winged ants in the air. The flocks often include other species such as the black-and-white monjita (Xolmis dominicanus), streamer-tailed tyrant (Gubernetes yetapa), and the Pseudoleistes marshbirds.

=== Breeding ===
The saffron-cowled blackbird breeds between October and December. It nests solitarily or in colonies of up to about 40 nests; in colonies breeding is synchronized. Most colonies are in marshes or abandoned rice fields but in Entre Rios many are on dry land. It is possibly a cooperative breeder, as some nests have had two males attending. The female builds the nest, a cup made mostly from grass and lined with fine plant fibers. It is typically within 1 m (3 ft) above the substrate, whether in marsh plants above water or above land in plants like thistle or a shrub. The clutch is usually four eggs though three to five are known; they are pale with dense red spotting. The female alone incubates, for 12 to 13 days. Fledging occurs about 12 days after hatch and both parents provision and defend nestlings. The shiny cowbird (Moluthrus bonariensis) is a common brood parasite.

=== Vocalization ===
Both sexes of the saffron-cowled blackbird sing. The song is "brief and unmusical, starts with short whistled or warbled notes, ends with rasping kluijjjjjj". The species' most common call is chep.

== Status ==
The IUCN originally in 1988 assessed the saffron-cowled blackbird as Threatened, then in 1994 as Endangered, in 2000 as Vulnerable, and since 2019 again as Endangered. It has a small range that has contracted over time; its estimated population of between 1500 and 7000 mature individuals is believed to be decreasing. "Breeding is often colonial, and only a small number of breeding sites have been discovered." "The species has declined owing to a number of human impacts on grasslands, including stock-raising, cultivation, pesticides, burning, pine and eucalypt plantations, drainage and settlement." Significant numbers are captured for the illegal cage bird trade. It is considered "uncommon or absent in most of its former range" and "uncommon to rare" in Brazil. It is found in several national parks and other protected areas.
