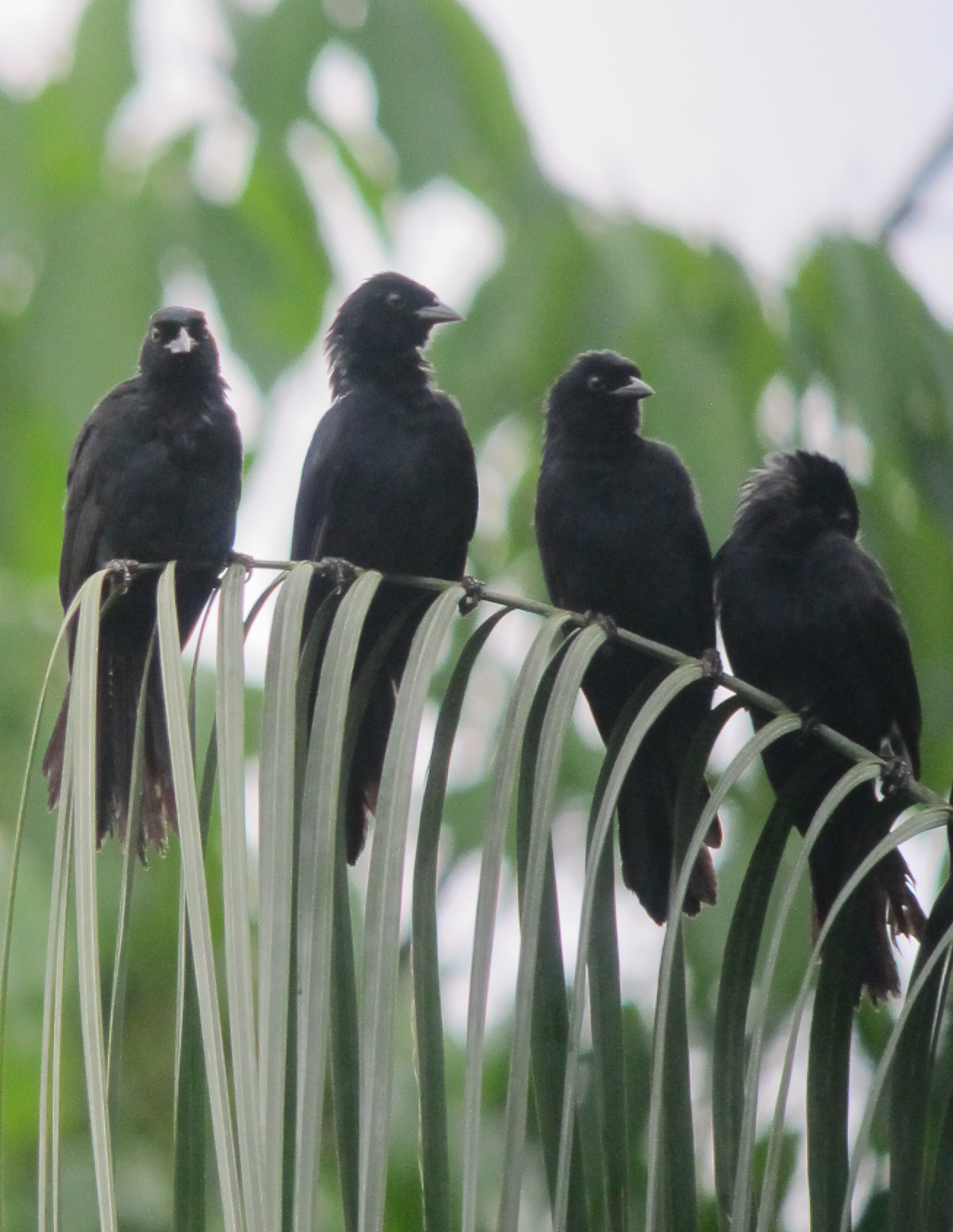
- In Puerto Nariño, Amazonas Department, Colombia

Conservation status
- Least Concern (IUCN 3.1)

Scientific classification
- Kingdom: Animalia
- Phylum: Chordata
- Class: Aves
- Order: Passeriformes
- Family: Icteridae
- Genus: Lampropsar; Cabanis, 1847
- Species: L. tanagrinus

Binomial name
- Lampropsar tanagrinus (Spix, 1824)

= Velvet-fronted grackle =

Species of bird

The velvet-fronted grackle (Lampropsar tanagrinus) is a species of bird in the family Icteridae, monotypic within the genus Lampropsar. It is found in Bolivia, Brazil, Colombia, Ecuador, Guyana, Peru, and Venezuela where its natural habitats are subtropical or tropical swamps and heavily degraded former forest.

== Taxonomy ==
The velvet-fronted grackle was formally described in 1824 as Icterus tanagrinus by the German naturalist Johann Baptist von Spix. The specific epithet is Modern Latin meaning "tanager-like", from the genus Tanagra that had been introduced by Carl Linnaeus in 1764. The type locality was designated by the Brazilian zoologist Olivério Pinto in 1944 as the left bank of the Amazon River at Itacoatiara in the Brazilian state of Amazonas. The velvet-fronted grackle is now the only species placed in the genus Lampropsar that was introduced in 1847 by the German ornithologist Jean Cabanis. In 1848 he placed a single taxon in the genus, Lampropsa guianensis Cabanis. This is the type species. It is now considered as a subspecies of the velvet-fronted grackle. The genus name combines the Ancient Greek λαμπρος/lampros meaning "brilliant" with ψαρ/psar, ψαρος/psaros meaning "starling".

Five subspecies are recognised:

- L. t. guianensis Cabanis, JL, 1849 – tropical northern Venezuela to northwestern Guyana and far northern Brazil (Roraima)
- L. t. tanagrinus (Spix, JB, 1824) – southeastern Colombia to eastern Ecuador, northern Peru, and western Amazonian Brazil (Amazonas eastward to lower Rio Negro and Rio Madeira)
- L. t. macropterus Gyldenstolpe, NCGF, 1945 – western Brazil (upper Río Juruá)
- L. t. violaceus Hellmayr, CE, 1906 – western Brazil (northwestern Mato Grosso)
- L. t. boliviensis Gyldenstolpe, NCGF, 1941 – northern Bolivia (Beni and northern Santa Cruz)

The species was the subject of a combined genetic and morphometric study by Eduardo Schultz and collaborators that was published in 2025. The results suggested that the velvet-fronted grackle should be split into three species:

- Lampropsar tanagrinus (Spix, JB, 1824) that is found in the floodplain of the western and central Amazon basin. The subspecies L. t. macropterus Gyldenstolpe, NCGF, 1945, is synonymized with this taxon.
- Lampropsar guianensis Cabanis, JL, 1849, that is found in the Orinoco basin of Venezuela and Colombia.
- Lampropsar violaceus Hellmayr, CE, 1906, that is found in the floodplain of the basin formed by the Beni, Mamoré and Guaporé Rivers mostly in northern Bolivia. The subspecies L. t. boliviensis Gyldenstolpe, 1941, is synonymized with this taxon.

== Description ==
The male velvet-fronted grackle grows to about 22 cm (9 in) and the female about 19 cm (7.5 in). Both sexes are entirely black, with a slight bluish gloss on the dorsal surfaces. The feathers at the front of the crown are very short and dense, giving a velvet-like appearance at close quarters. The beak is short, conical and pointed, the iris is dark and the tail is long and somewhat rounded. The calls produced include a crackling "chack" and a whistling "cheziit", and the song, sometimes sung at dusk from a perch, is a moderately-musical rapid gurgling sound. This species could be confused with the shiny cowbird (Molothrus bonariensis), but their calls and habits are quite different.

== Distribution and habitat ==
The velvet-fronted grackle has two separate populations; one is in Venezuela and Guyana; the other is in southern Colombia, eastern Ecuador, northern Peru, western Brazil and northern and central Bolivia. Its typical habitat is várzea forests which periodically become flooded, forest borders and swamps near ponds; rivers and lakes.

== Behaviour ==
This species often congregates with others of its kind in small groups of up to about twenty birds. Sometimes these coalesce with groups of tanagers and caciques. The birds move noisily through the canopy, foraging high and low, and sometimes hopping around on floating vegetation on lakes. The diet includes insects such as winged ants and beetles but is poorly described. In Guyana it breeds in March, in Ecuador in September and in Bolivia in October and February.

== Status ==
The International Union for Conservation of Nature has classified L. tanagrinus as being of "least concern". This is on the basis that the bird has a very wide range, the population is believed to be steady, and the bird is fairly common. The total population is estimated to be over 10,000 mature individuals, with a total range of about 2,420,000 km^{2} (934,400 mi^{2}).
