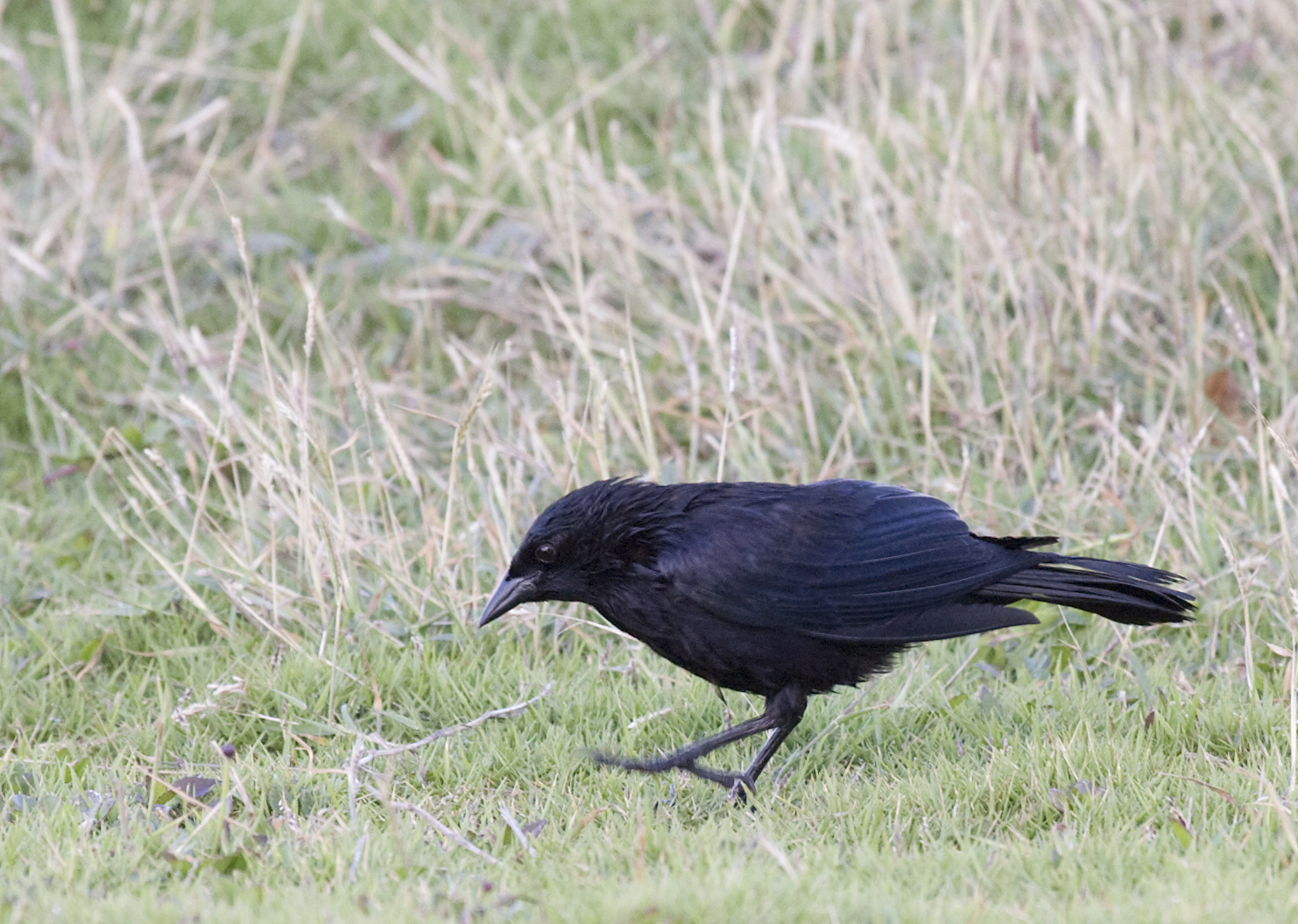
- In Havana, Cuba

Conservation status
- Least Concern (IUCN 3.1)

Scientific classification
- Kingdom: Animalia
- Phylum: Chordata
- Class: Aves
- Order: Passeriformes
- Family: Icteridae
- Genus: Ptiloxena; Chapman, 1892
- Species: P. atroviolacea

Binomial name
- Ptiloxena atroviolacea (d'Orbigny, 1839)
- Range of P. atroviolacea

Synonyms
- See text

= Cuban blackbird =

Species of bird

The Cuban blackbird (Ptiloxena atroviolacea) is a species of bird in the family Icteridae, the oropendolas, New World orioles, and New World blackbirds. It is endemic to Cuba.

== Taxonomy and systematics ==
The Cuban blackbird has a complicated taxonomic history. It was formally described in 1839 with the binomial Quiscalus atroviolaceous. Later in the century most authors placed it in genus Dives. In 1892 Frank Chapman assigned it to the monotypic genus Ptdiloxena but most others retained it in Dives. Studies published in the early twenty-first century confirmed that it belongs in Ptdiloxena. The IOC adopted the change in 2014, BirdLife International's Handbook of the Birds of the World in 2016, and the American Ornithological Society in 2017.

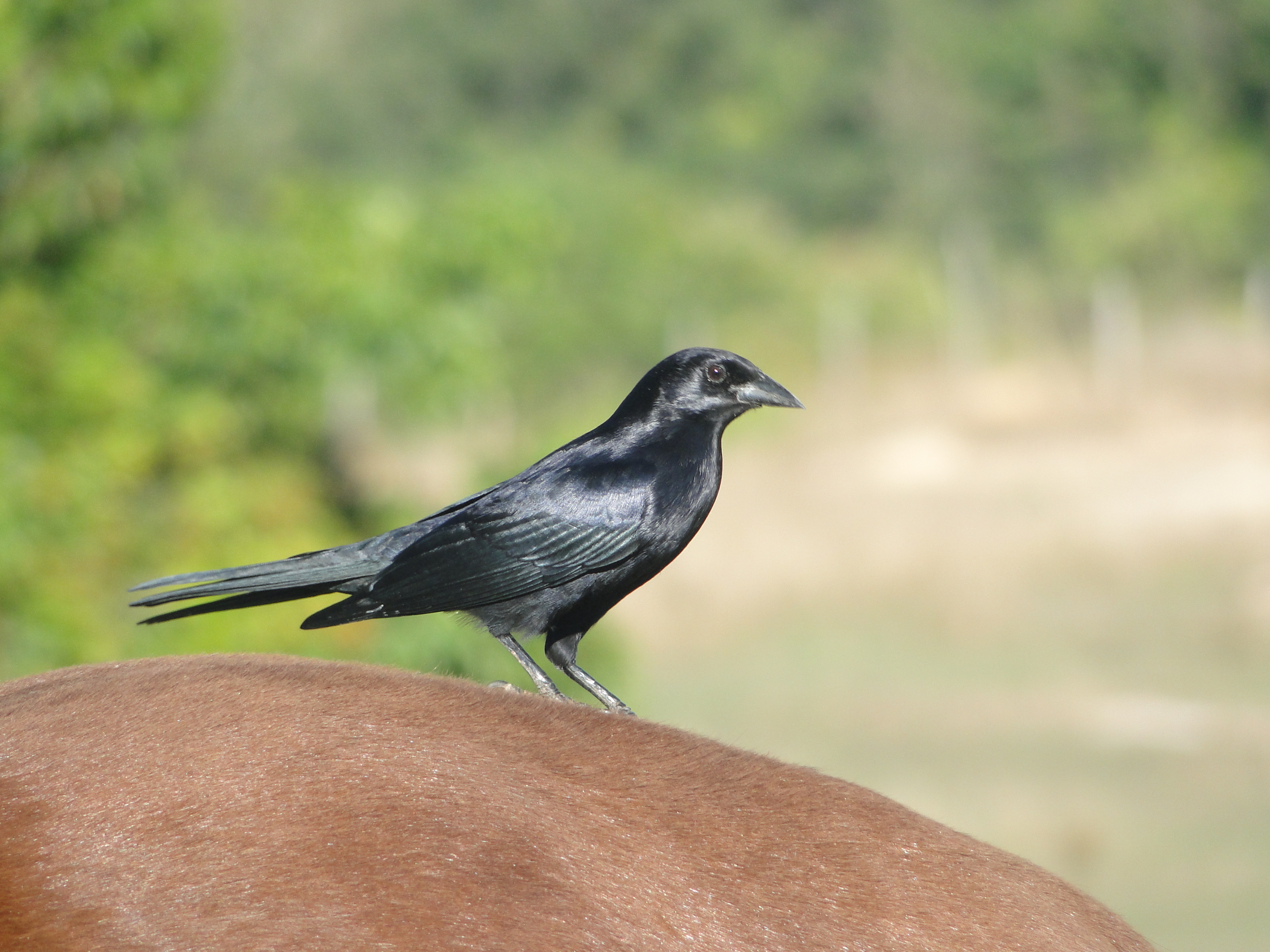
A Cuban blackbird in Pinar del Rio Province

== Description ==
The Cuban blackbird is 25 to 28 cm (10 to 11 in) long and weighs 70 to 94 g (2.5 to 3.3 oz). The sexes have almost the same plumage. Adult males are entirely black with bluish and purple iridescence on their upperparts and a greenish sheen on the wings and uppertail coverts. Females are also black but have less iridescence than males. Both sexes have a dark brown iris, a black bill, and black legs and feet. Juveniles are a duller, non-glossy, brownish black.

== Distribution and habitat ==
The Cuban blackbird is found throughout the main island of Cuba and on a few small cays off its northern and southern shores but is absent from most cays. Though some sources place it on Isla de la Juventud ("Isle of Pines") the only records there lack supporting photographic or audio confirmation. It inhabits virtually all available forested landscapes and is also common in croplands, gardens, and suburban and urban areas. In elevation it ranges from sea level to about 950 m (3,100 ft).

== Behavior ==
=== Movement ===
The Cuban blackbird is a year-round resident.

=== Feeding ===
The Cuban blackbird is omnivorous; its diet includes insects, other arthropods, small vertebrates, seeds, fruit, and nectar. It primarily forages on the ground but also feeds in all parts of trees to the canopy. It has been observed picking ticks and other parasites from farm animals. It usually forages in pairs or family groups but does form large flocks that sometimes include other icterids.

=== Breeding ===
The Cuban blackbird's breeding season extends from March until August with most activity taking place in May and June. The nest is a cup built by both sexes from a variety of plant fibers, hair, and feathers with a lining of fine fibers. The nest is placed in an enclosed site such as a cavity in a tree or a human-made structure, at the base of a palm frond, or in a clump of bromeliads. The clutch is three to five eggs that are white to greenish white with gray to brown markings. It is not certain if the female alone or both parents incubate, and the apparent period of about 12 days has not been confirmed. The time to fledging is not known. Both parents are believed to provision nestlings. Though it shares its range and habitat with the shiny cowbird (Molothrus bonariensis), it is not known to host that brood parasite.

=== Vocalization ===
The Cuban blackbird has a "[v]ast variety of calls; most typical is loud, repetitive tí-o, with metallic tone". This vocalization is also described as a song and written as "metallic twee-o and twee-te-to notes". Another common vocalization is " a chok, chok, chok, lee, lee, lee".

== Status ==
The IUCN has assessed the Cuban blackbird as being of Least Concern. It has a large range; its population size is not known but is believed to be stable. No immediate threats have been identified. It is considered "common and widespread". "The Cuban Blackbird appears to be tolerant of considerable habitat modification, being able to live and breed in towns and cities."
