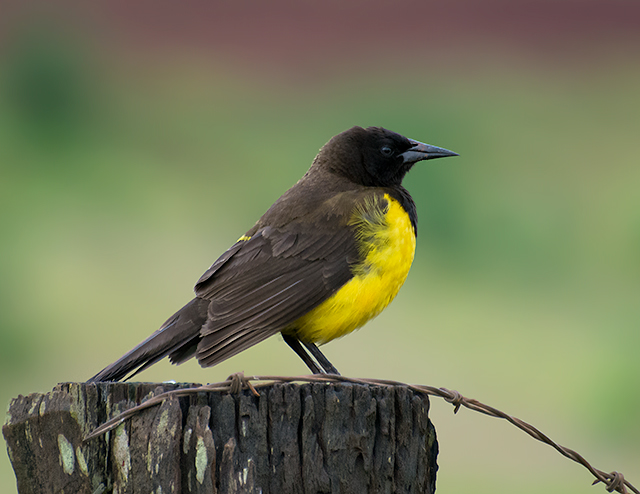

Conservation status
- Least Concern (IUCN 3.1)

Scientific classification
- Kingdom: Animalia
- Phylum: Chordata
- Class: Aves
- Order: Passeriformes
- Family: Icteridae
- Genus: Pseudoleistes
- Species: P. guirahuro

Binomial name
- Pseudoleistes guirahuro (Vieillot, 1819)

= Yellow-rumped marshbird =

Species of bird

The yellow-rumped marshbird (Pseudoleistes guirahuro) is a species of bird in the family Icteridae, the oropendolas, New World orioles, and New World blackbirds. It is found in Argentina, Brazil, Paraguay, and Uruguay.

== Taxonomy and systematics ==
The yellow-rumped marshbird was formally described in 1819 with the binomial Agelaius virescens. It now shares the genus Pseudoleistes with the brown-and-yellow marshbird (P. virescens).

The yellow-rumped marshbird is monotypic.

== Description ==
Male yellow-rumped marshbirds average 25.5 cm (10 in) long. Males weigh an average of 91.2 g (3.2 oz) and females average 81.9 g (2.9 oz). The sexes have the same plumage. Adults have a blackish brown head, neck, and upper breast. Their upperparts are mostly brown with a rich yellow rump. Their wings are mostly brown with rich yellow median and lesser coverts that show as an epaulet. Their tail is brown. Their lower breast and belly are rich yellow and their undertail coverts brown with thin yellow edges. Both sexes have a brown iris, a blackish bill, and blackish legs and feet. Juveniles are similar to adults but have browner upperparts with paler edges on some feathers, a yellowish throat, and a paler yellow breast with wide brownish streaks.

== Distribution and habitat ==
The yellow-rumped marshbird is found in Brazil south from a line that roughly follows west-central Mato Grosso - northern Goiás - Rio de Janeiro state. Its range continues south through eastern Paraguay into northern Uruguay and to northeastern Argentina's Corrientes and northern Santa Fe provinces. Small numbers may extend further south to northern Entre Ríos Province. Its range overlaps the northern part of the brown-and-yellow marshbird's range.

The yellow-rumped marshbird inhabits marshes, wet grasslands, nearby drier uplands, rice fields, and wet savannas with sparse trees. It is "of the few icterids found in cerrado". Though it is mostly a bird of the lowlands it reaches 1,100 m (3,600 ft) in Brazil.

== Behavior ==
=== Movement ===
The yellow-rumped marshbird is a year-round resident.

=== Feeding ===
The yellow-rumped marshbird feeds on insects, other arthropods, lesser numbers of small vertebrates, and some seeds. It forages both on the ground and in low vegetation. In the non-breeding season it forages in flocks that can number 50 individuals and can include other icterids. Some flock members remain alert as sentinels.

=== Breeding ===
The yellow-rumped marshbird breeds between October and January in Paraguay; its season in far southern Brazil includes October and November. It nests solitarily and is a cooperative breeder with as many as six helpers at a nest. The female does most nest building, making a cup from plant material and mud lined with fine fibers. It is typically placed up to about 2.5 m (8 ft) above the ground in grass, marsh vegetation like cat-tails, or in a small shrub or tree. The clutch is three to six eggs that are white to pinkish white with darker markings of several colors. The female alone incubates, for about 14 days, and is fed by the male. Fledging occurs about 12 days after hatch; both parents and the helpers provision nestlings. The shiny cowbird (Moluthrus bonariensis) is a common brood parasite.

=== Vocalization ===
The yellow-rumped marshbird's song is "a mix of whistles, warbles, slurs and nasal buzzes" that is similar to that of the brown-and-yellow marshbird but slower and not as screechy. Its common calls are kwet-kwetéé and koink. Groups commonly vocalize together both when perched and in flight.

== Status ==
The IUCN has assessed the yellow-rumped marshbird as being of Least Concern. It has a large range; its population size is not known but is believed to be stable. No immediate threats have been identified. It is considered common in most of its range though less so in the southernmost parts in Argentina. It is "common to frequent" in Brazil. It occurs in several national parks and preserves.
