= Blue and John Crow Mountains National Park =

National park in Jamaica

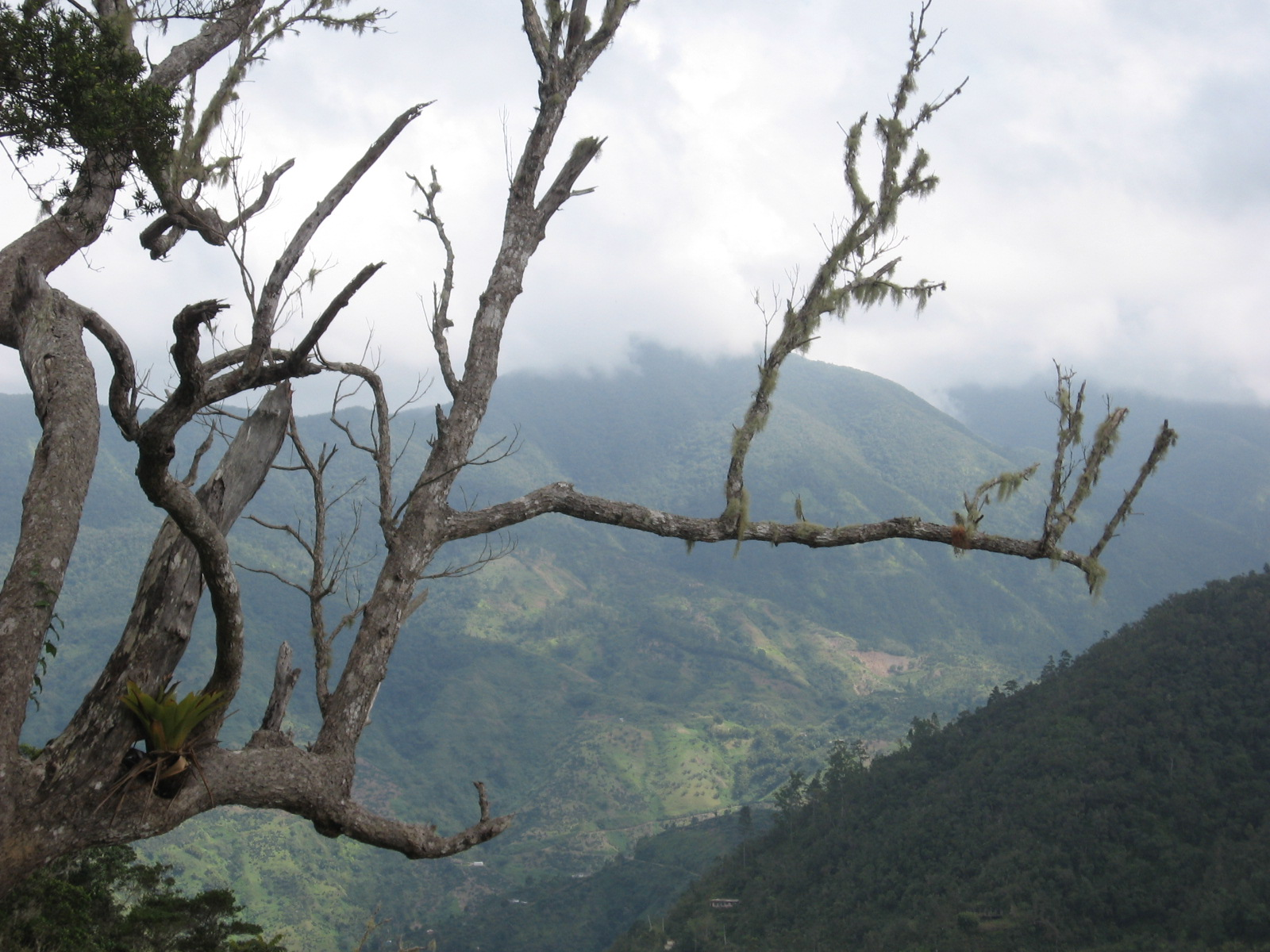

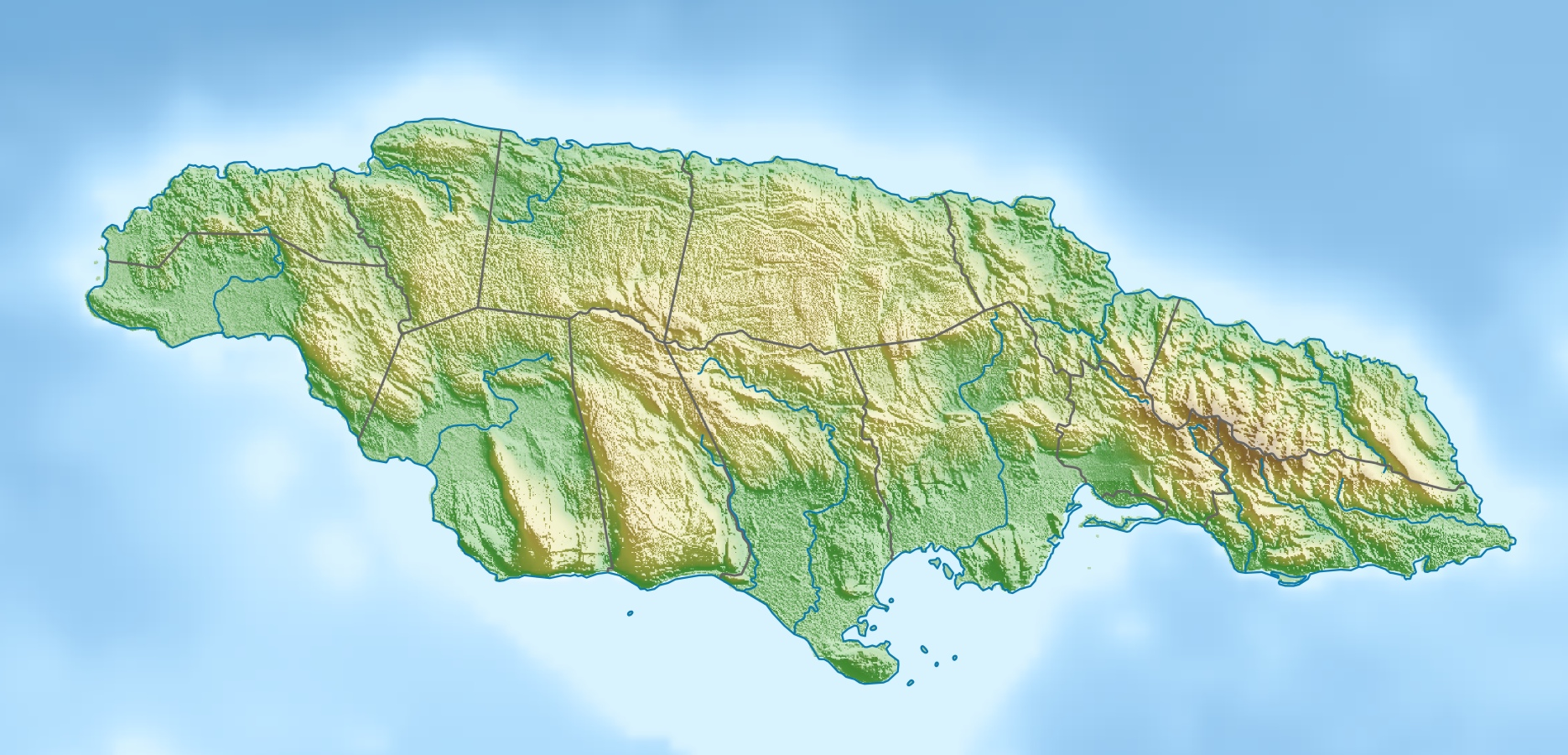
- Location within Jamaica
- Location: Eastern Jamaica
- Nearest city: Kingston
- Coordinates: 18°02′46″N 76°24′35″W
- Area: 495.2 km^{2} (191.2 sq mi)
- Website: www.blueandjohncrowmountains.org

UNESCO World Heritage Site
- Type: Mixed
- Criteria: iii, vi, x
- Designated: 2015 (39th session)
- Reference no.: 1356

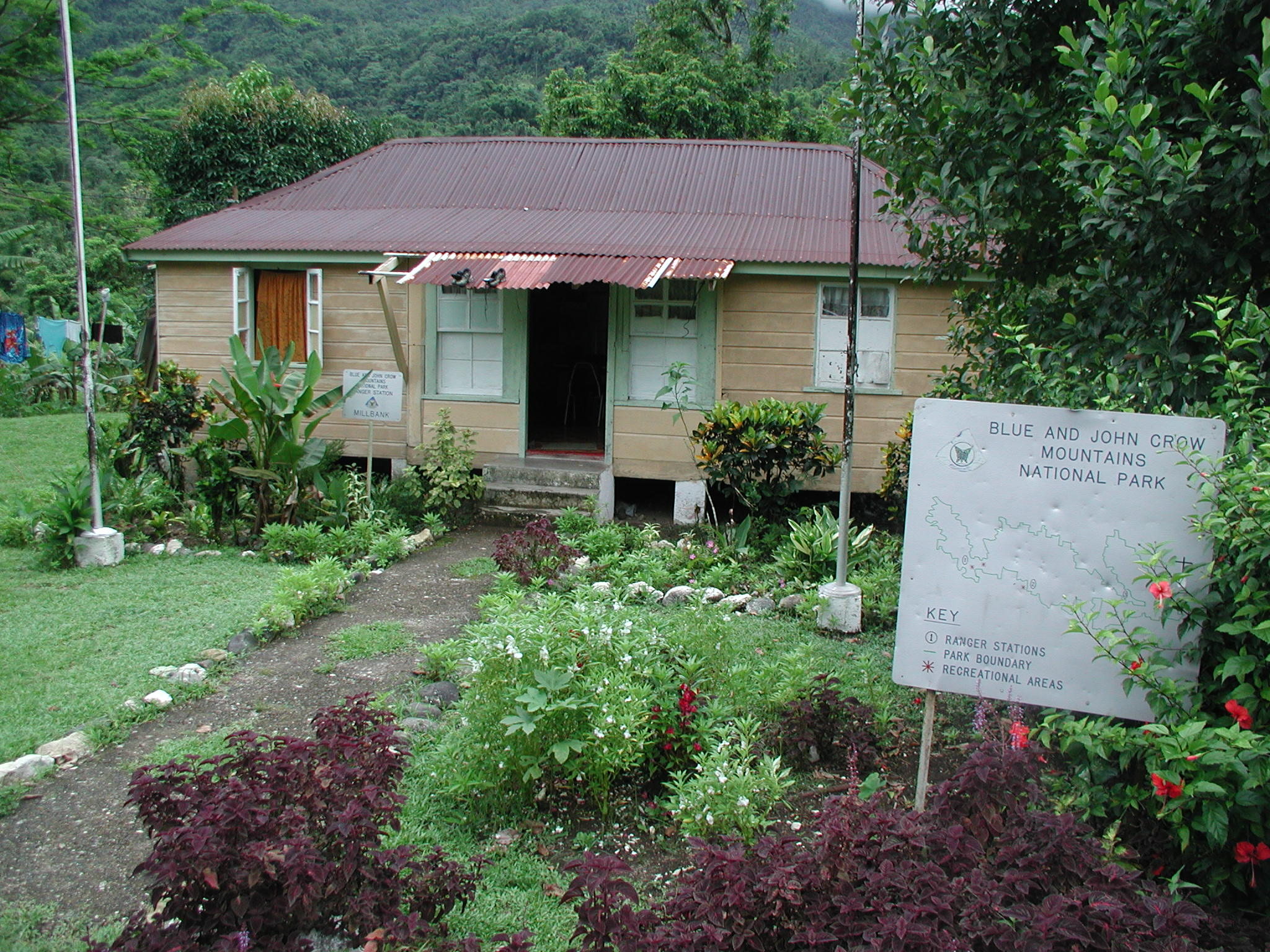
Blue and John Crow Mountains National Park ranger station, June 2005

Blue and John Crow Mountains National Park is a national park in Jamaica. The park covers 495.2 km^{2} and accounts for 4.5% of Jamaica's land surface. It derives its name from the Blue Mountains, the mountain range that runs through it, as well as from the common bird found in the park, the "John crow" (turkey vulture, Cathartes aura). The park is globally recognized for its biodiversity. This park is the last of two known habitats of the giant swallowtail butterfly (Papilio homerus), the largest butterfly in the Western Hemisphere and also the habitat for the endangered Jamaican blackbird (Nesopsar nigerrimus). Additionally, it serves as a refuge for the Jamaican boa (Chilabothrus subflavus) and the Jamaican hutia (Geocapromys brownii).

The park was inscribed to be a UNESCO World Heritage Site for mixed criteria (cultural and natural) on 3 July 2015.
