= William Alexander Forbes =

English zoologist

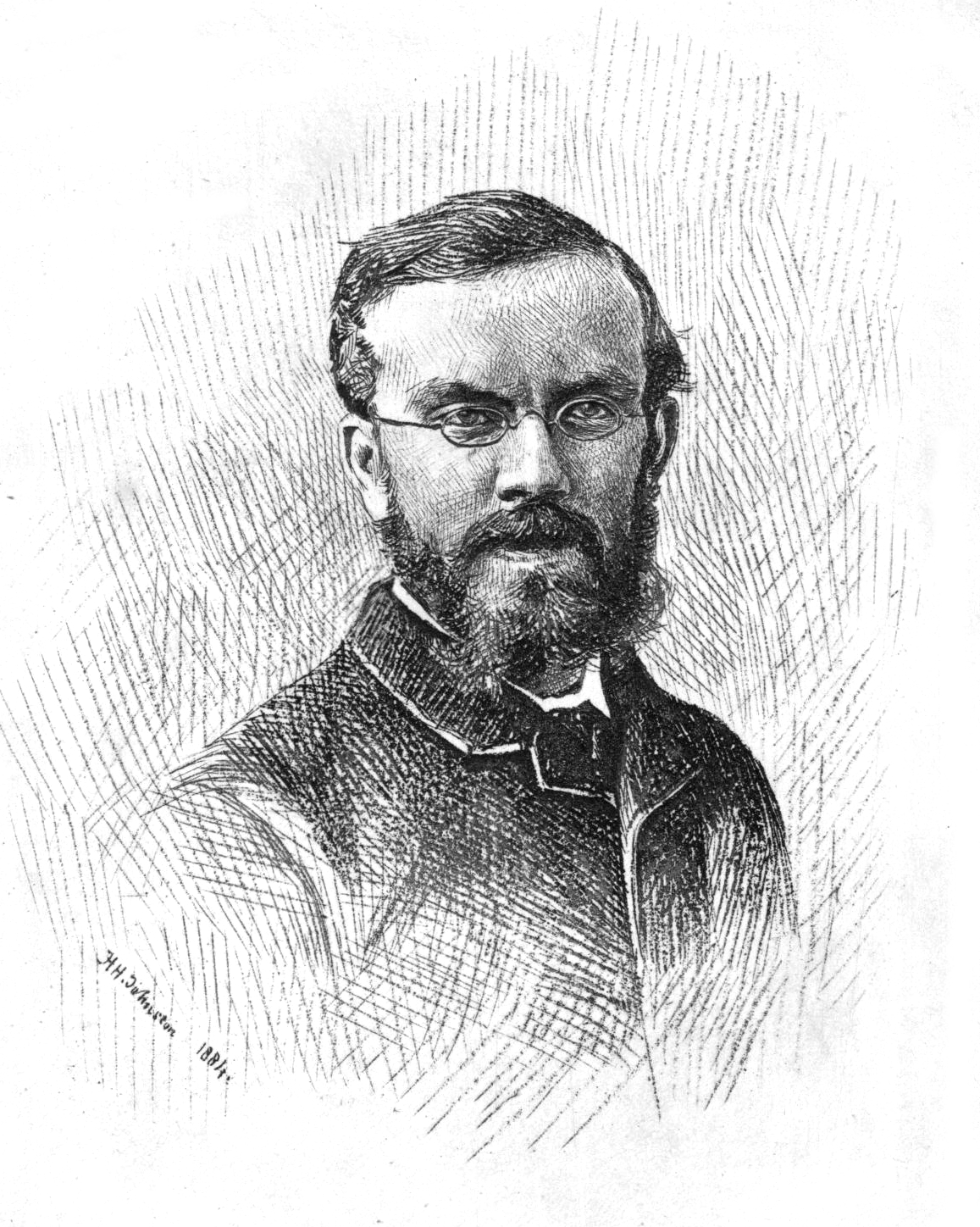
- Portrait of Forbes
- Born: 25 June 1855; Cheltenham, England
- Died: 14 January 1883 (aged 27); Shonga, modern Nigeria
- Occupation: Zoologist

William Alexander Forbes (25 June 1855 – 14 January 1883) was an English zoologist. He was the son of James Staats Forbes (1823–1904).

Forbes studied natural sciences at St John's College, Cambridge, and later taught at Rhodes College (then known as Stewart College). In 1879 he was appointed prosector to the Zoological Society of London on the death of the previous incumbent, Alfred Henry Garrod, who was Forbes's friend and whose literary executor Forbes became. Forbes lectured on comparative anatomy at Charing Cross Hospital Medical School. As an anatomist, he wrote valuable papers on the muscular structure and voice organs of birds.

On 8 February 1878, Forbes was elected Secretary of the Cambridge Natural History Society. He also edited the book compiling the late Alfred Henry Garrod's scientific papers; the book was published in 1881 along with a memoir of Garrod written by Forbes.

In 1880 Forbes visited the forests of Pernambuco, Brazil, and published an account of his trip in The Ibis in 1881. In 1882 he travelled to west Africa to study the native fauna, starting from the mouth of the Niger delta (an area where British merchants had set up large scales of trade, it would become part of the Niger Coast Protectorate or the Oil Rivers Protectorate in about two year). He was taken ill shortly after Christmas and died in Shonga.

Forbes is commemorated in the names of the Forbes's blackbird Anumara forbesi, white-collared kite Leptodon forbesi and the Forbes's plover Charadrius forbesi.
