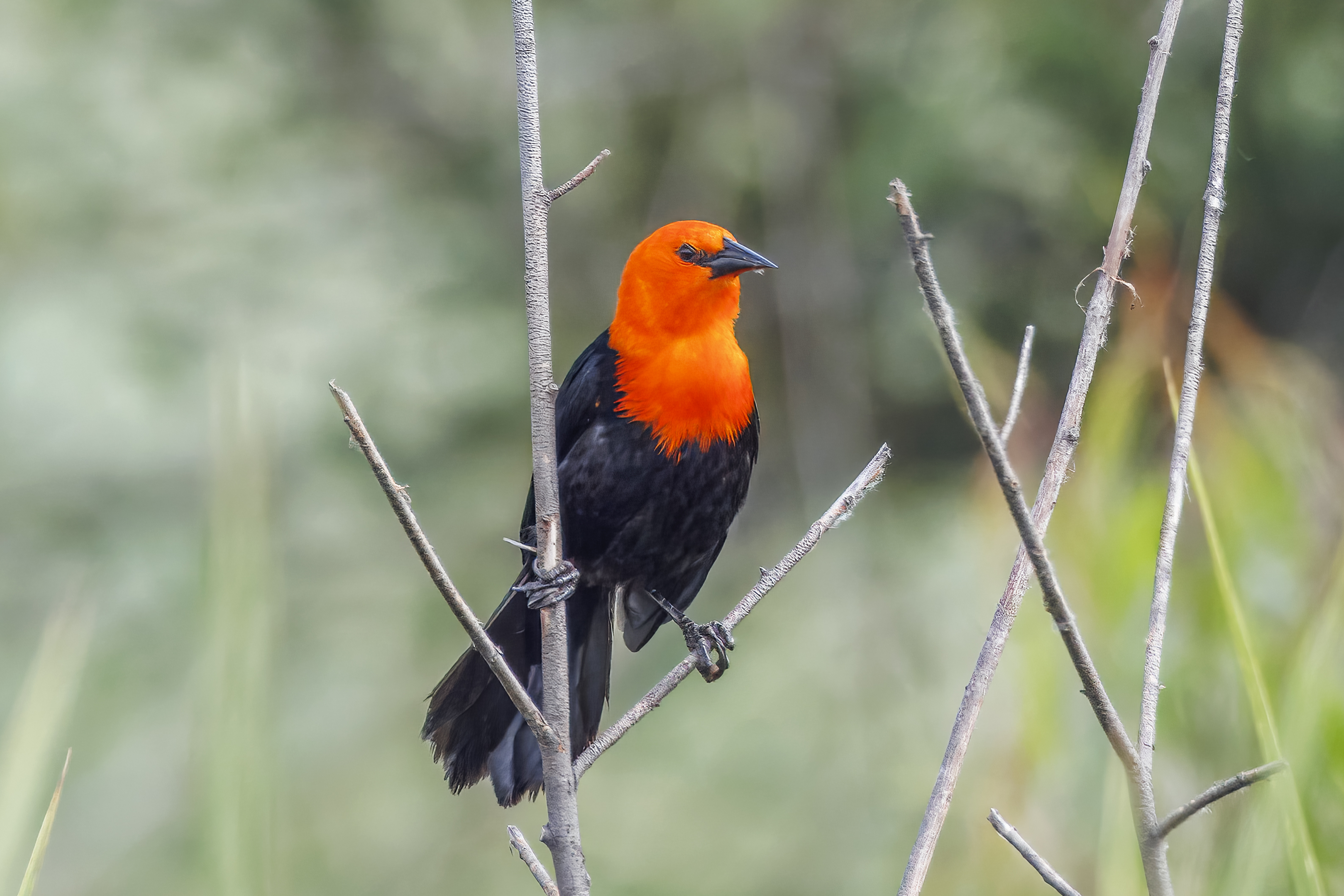
- In the Pantanal, Brazil

Conservation status
- Least Concern (IUCN 3.1)

Scientific classification
- Kingdom: Animalia
- Phylum: Chordata
- Class: Aves
- Order: Passeriformes
- Family: Icteridae
- Genus: Amblyramphus; Leach, 1814
- Species: A. holosericeus

Binomial name
- Amblyramphus holosericeus (Scopoli, 1786)

= Scarlet-headed blackbird =

Species of bird

The scarlet-headed blackbird (Amblyramphus holosericeus) is a species of bird in the family Icteridae, the oropendolas, New World orioles, and New World blackbirds. It is found in Argentina, Bolivia, Brazil, Paraguay, and Uruguay.

== Taxonomy and systematics ==
The scarlet-headed blackbird was formally described in 1786 with the binomial Xanthornus holosericeus. It is now the only member of genus Amblyramphus and has no subspecies.

== Description ==
Male scarlet-headed blackbirds average 25 cm (9.8 in) long and weigh an average of 86 g (3.0 oz). Females average 22.5 cm (8.9 in) long and weigh an average of 75 g (2.6 oz). The sexes have the same plumage. Adults have a thin black stripe behind the lores and black eyelids. The rest of their head and their neck, upper breast, and thighs are scarlet-red. The rest of their plumage is a slightly glossy black. They have a black iris, a sharp, chisel-shaped black bill, and black legs and feet. Juveniles are almost entirely brownish black with a yellowish wash on the throat and breast; they gradually acquire the adult's red.

== Distribution and habitat ==
The scarlet-headed blackbird has a disjunct distribution. Its largest range from northern Buenos Aires Province in northeastern Argentina north through Uruguay into far southern Brazil's southern and eastern Rio Grande do Sul state. Further west it extends north through northeastern Argentina and southern and central Paraguay, Brazil's Paraná and western São Paulo states, extreme eastern Bolivia, and western Mato Grosso do Sul and southwestern Mato Grosso states in Brazil. There are isolated reports in Brazil east and north of its regular range. The species' second largest range is in north-central Bolivia's Beni and Santa Cruz departments. There are also small isolated populations in northwestern Argentina.

The scarlet-headed blackbird primarily inhabits marshes with extensive stands of Cyperus sedge, Typha cattail, and Thalia arrowroot. It also is found in nearby grasslands and agricultural fields. In elevation it seldom exceeds 600 m (2,000 ft).

== Behavior ==
=== Movement ===
The scarlet-headed blackbird is not a migrant and remains year-round in permanent marshes. However, it roams during the dry season and droughts to find suitable habitat.

=== Feeding ===
The scarlet-headed blackbird feeds mostly on insects though there are reports of its eating small frogs. During the dry season it also feeds on the seeds of cultivated crops like maize (Zea mays) and sorghum (Sorghum bicolor). It extracts prey from plant stems with its chisel bill. In the breeding season it usually forages in pairs in their territory but in the non-breeding season forms flocks that may have 100 individuals.

=== Breeding ===
The scarlet-headed blackbird breeds between October and December in central Argentina and its season continues into February and early march in northern Argentina. Its season elsewhere has not been defined. It is monogamous and a solitary, highly territorial, breeder. Females do most of the nest building with some aid from the male. They weave it from strips of leaf, primarily Typha, attached to a few stems of marsh plants, usually about 1 m (3 ft) above the water. The clutch is three to four eggs that are greenish blue with small dark brown markings. The female incubates for 13 to 14 days during which the male guards the nest. Fledging occurs about 13 days after hatch and both parents provision nestlings. Though nests are parasitized by the shiny cowbird (Molothrus bonariensis) the incidence appears to be low due to aggressive defense by the male blackbird.

=== Vocalization ===
The scarlet-headed blackbird's display song is variable but usually includes rattles or a nasal buzz. One rendering is "short phrases like viti-tju vid-dertjuuh" whose vi is extremely high and sharp and its tju slightly nasal. Both sexes make a contact call, "a long, descending and hesitant whistle, fee-ee-ee, with some up-and-down pitch variations".

== Status ==
The IUCN has assessed the scarlet-headed blackbird as being of Least Concern. It has a very large range; its population size is not known but is believed to be stable. No immediate threats have been identified. It is considered "uncommon to locally fairly common" overall and "uncommon to rare" in Brazil. "Drainage of marshes has so far not occurred on a large scale" and it occurs in several protected areas.

== Gallery ==
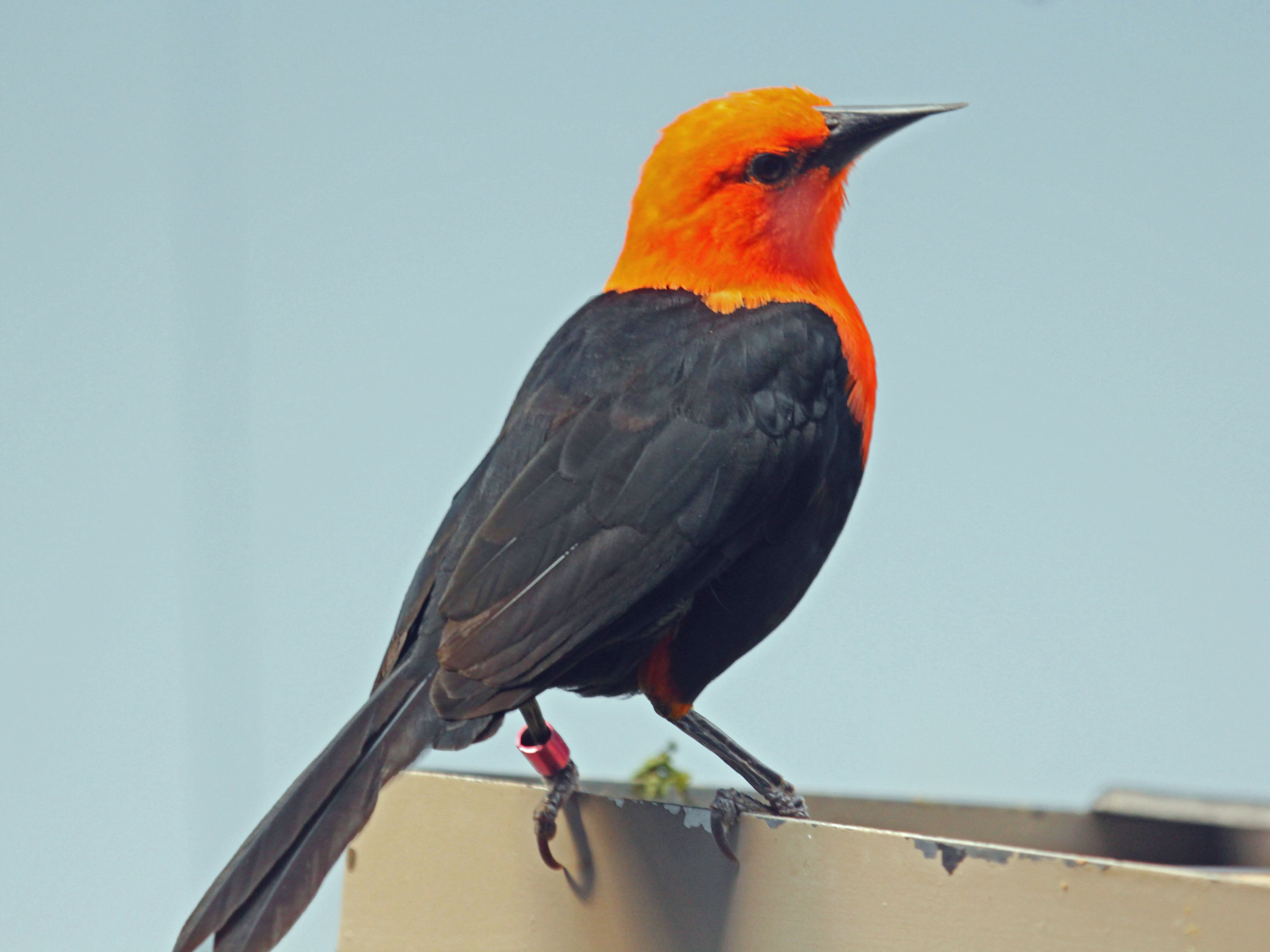

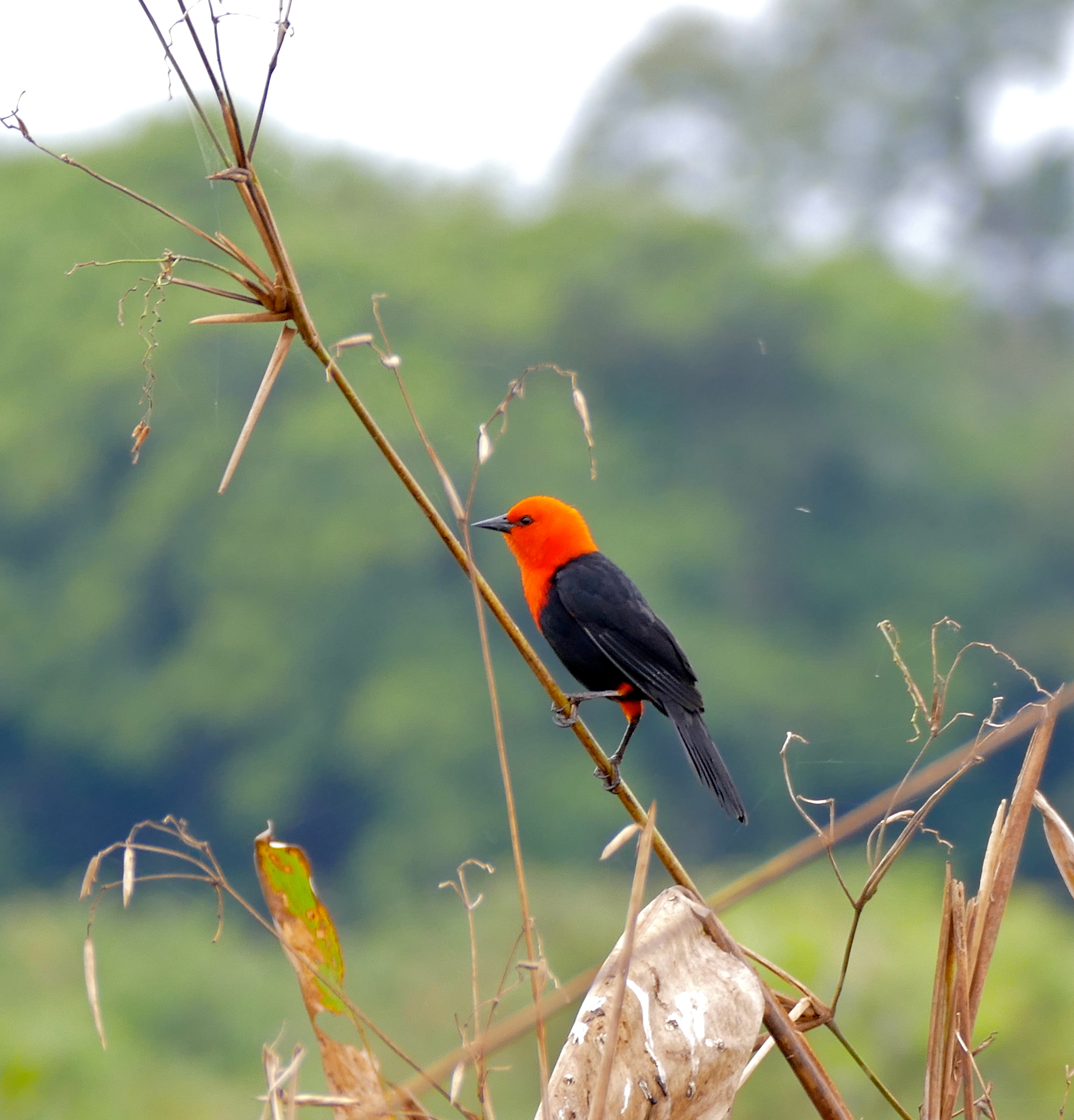

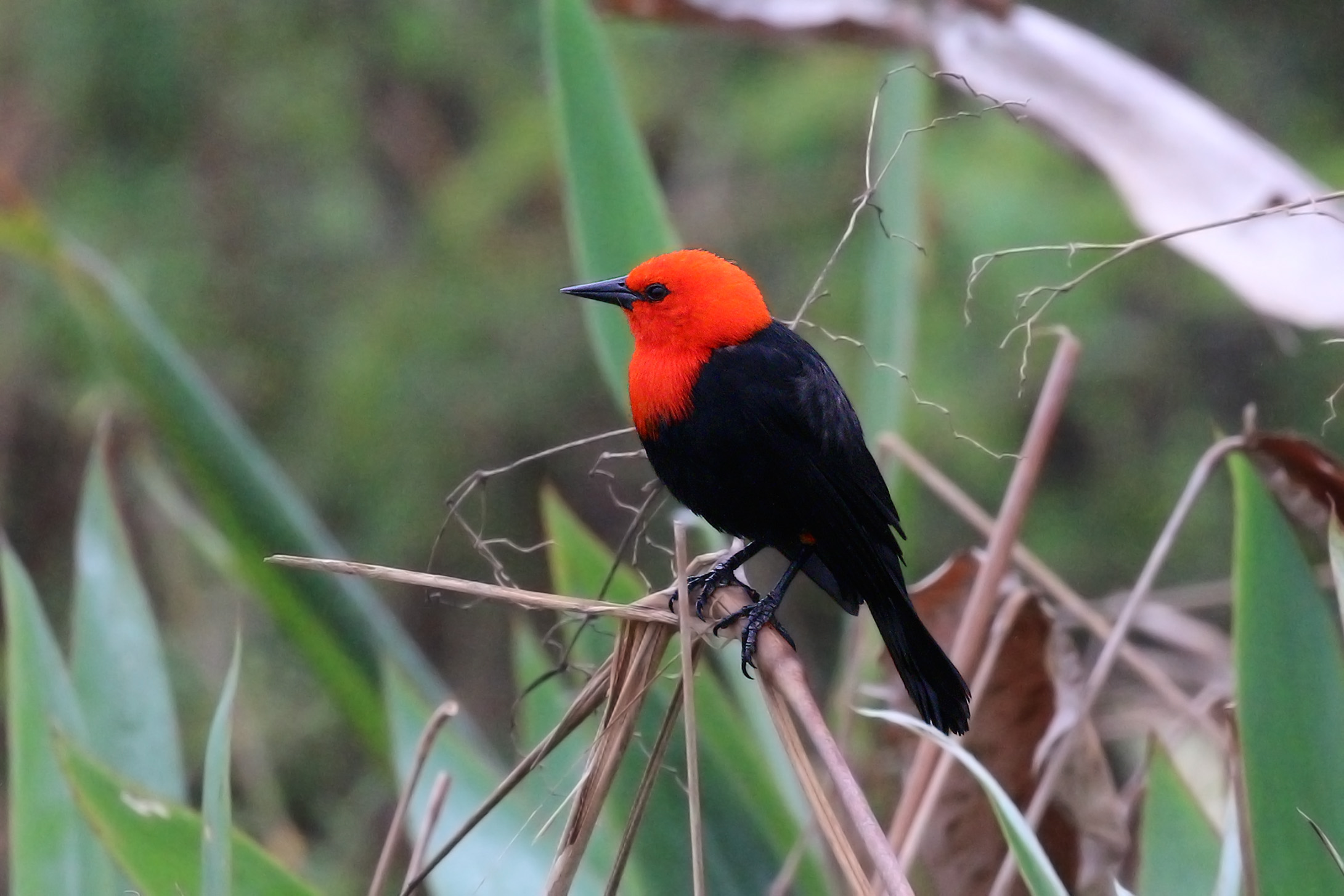

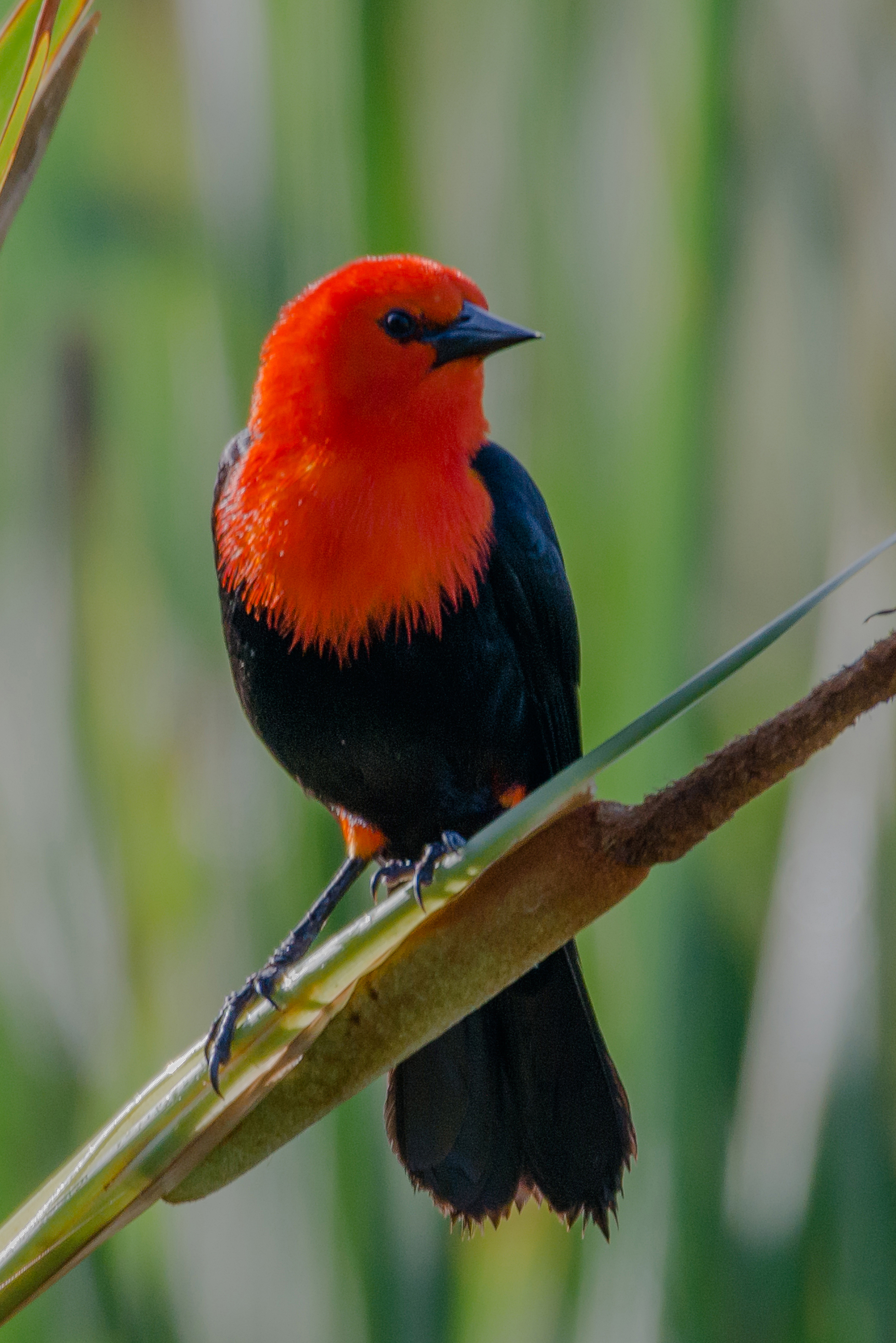
