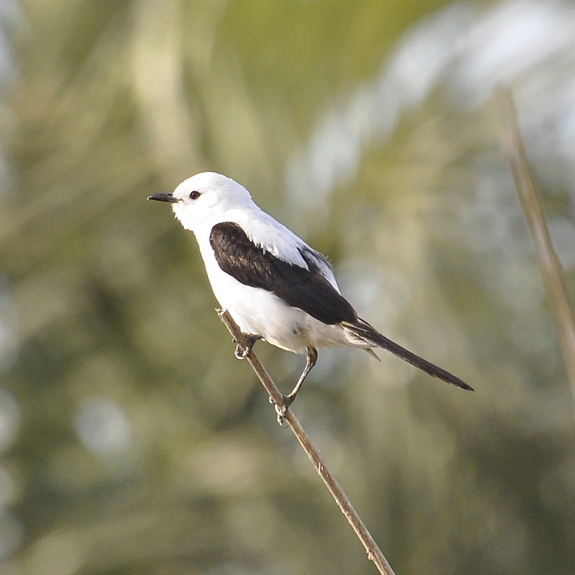
- A male in Rocha, Uruguay

Conservation status
- Vulnerable (IUCN 3.1)

Scientific classification
- Kingdom: Animalia
- Phylum: Chordata
- Class: Aves
- Order: Passeriformes
- Family: Tyrannidae
- Genus: Heteroxolmis; Lanyon, W, 1986
- Species: H. dominicana

Binomial name
- Heteroxolmis dominicana (Vieillot, 1823)

Synonyms
- Xolmis dominicana

= Black-and-white monjita =

Species of bird

The black-and-white monjita (Heteroxolmis dominicana) is a species of passerine bird in the family Tyrannidae, the tyrant flycatchers. It is found in Argentina, Brazil, Uruguay and possibly Paraguay.

== Taxonomy and systematics ==
The black-and-white monjita was formally described in 1823 as Tyrannus dominicanus. It was placed in genus Xolmis through much of the twentieth century. By the 1990s several authors had moved it to the new genus Heteroxolmis. The IOC had adopted the change by 2008. The South American Classification Committee of the American Ornithological Society (SACC) and the Clements taxonomy followed suit in 2021. However, as of December 2024 BirdLife International's Handbook of the Birds of the World retains the species as Xolmis dominicanus. Because the move of this species and several others from Xolmis resulted in species of several genera being called "monjita", the SACC is seeking a proposal to adopt new English names.

The black-and-white monjita is the only species in the genus Heteroxolmis and has no subspecies.

== Description ==
The black-and-white monjita is 20 to 20.5 cm (7.9 to 8.1 in) long. Adult males are mostly white. They have pale grayish smudging on the head and back, black wings with white outer thirds of the primaries, a long black tail, and entirely white underparts. Adult females have a brownish gray crown and back, white scapulars, and a white rump. Both sexes have a dark iris, a black bill, and black legs and feet. Juveniles have a rusty back.

== Distribution and habitat ==
The black-and-white monjita has a patchy distribution. It is found in Brazil's Paraná, Santa Catarina, and Rio Grande do Sul states, in Uruguay, and in northeastern Argentina south to northeastern Buenos Aires Province. The SACC has unconfirmed records from Paraguay and so calls the species hypothetical in that country.

The black-and-white monjita inhabits a variety of landscapes. It primarily is found in marshes and bogs characterized by Cypernus and Eryngium sedges. It also occurs in open or burned areas and locally on the landward side of coastal sand dunes. It does forage in grasslands adjoining the wetter areas. In elevation it mostly ranges from sea level to 500 m (1,600 ft) but occasionally is found much higher.

== Behavior ==
=== Movement ===
The black-and-white monjita is a year-round resident.

=== Feeding ===
The black-and-white monjita feeds on insects. It perches low down and drops onto prey on the ground. For an unknown reason it often forages with flocks of the saffron-cowled blackbird (Xanthopsar flavus).

=== Breeding ===
The black-and-white monjita's breeding season has not been fully defined but spans at least October to December in Brazil and September to December in Argentina. Its nest is a bulky open cup made from dry grass, coarse stems, and sometimes leaves, and lined with fine grass, feathers, and wool. It typically is hidden in a low bush or in a clump of grass. The clutch is three to four eggs. The incubation period, time to fledging, and details of parental care are not known. The nests are parasitized by the shiny cowbird (Molothrus bonariensis).

=== Vocalization ===
The black-and-white monjita is usually silent but does make a "soft, somewhat querulous weeyrt or wurrt call, especially when agitated".

== Status ==
The IUCN originally in 1988 assessed the black-and-white monjita as Threatened and since 1994 as Vulnerable. It is found in fewer than 100 locations scattered throughout 788,000 km^{2} (304,000 sq mi); the area actually occupied is unknown. (It is estimated to be 120,000 km^{2} (46,000 sq mi).) Its estimated population of between 14,000 – 17,500 mature individuals as of 2025 is believed to be decreasing. The principle threat is grassland habitat conversion for agriculture and livestock grazing. The species is considered rare to uncommon and very local. It is more common from Rio Grande do Sul south than in the more northern part of its range. It is additionally threatened by wildfire and brood parasitism from the shiny cowbird (Molothrus bonariensis). It occurs in many national parks and private reserves.
