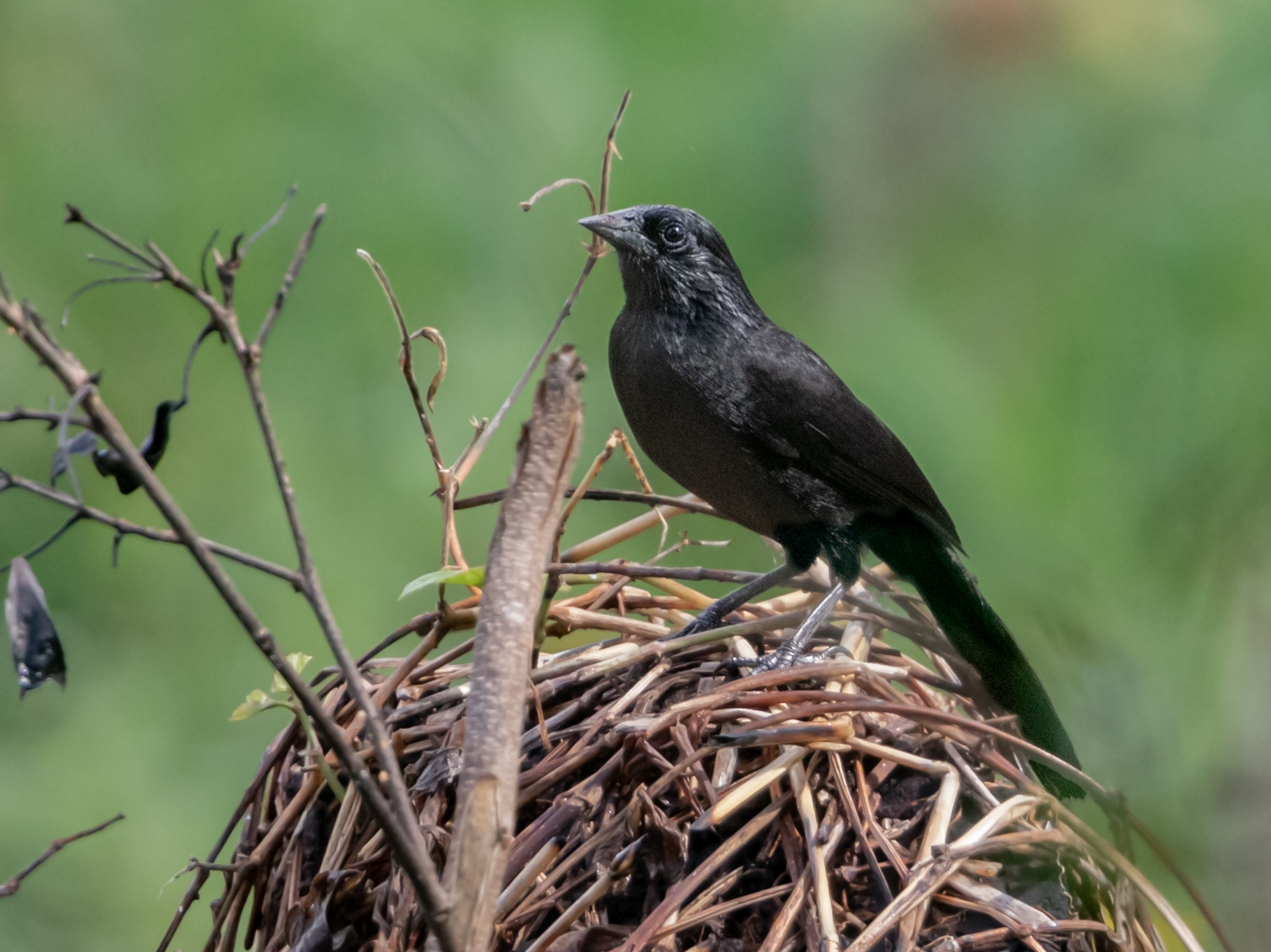

Conservation status
- Vulnerable (IUCN 3.1)

Scientific classification
- Kingdom: Animalia
- Phylum: Chordata
- Class: Aves
- Order: Passeriformes
- Family: Icteridae
- Genus: Anumara; Powell et al., 2014
- Species: A. forbesi

Binomial name
- Anumara forbesi (Sclater, PL, 1886)

Synonyms
- Curaeus forbesi

= Forbes's blackbird =

Species of bird

Forbes's blackbird (Anumara forbesi) is a vulnerable species of New World blackbird that is endemic to the Atlantic forest in South America. This species was named for the British zoologist William Alexander Forbes.

== Identification ==
Forbes's blackbird is an average sized icterid around 21–24 cm with all black, non-glossy feathers. It has a slender, arrow-shaped bill with a straight culmen, equal to the length of its head. It has a long, slender tail with rounded feathers. As a perching bird it has an anisodactyl toe arrangement with three toes facing forward and one back. It has a harsh and buzzy call and chatters. It is often mistaken for the chopi blackbird (Gnorimopsar chopi), which can be distinguished by its glossy feathers and a distinct curve in the culmen of the beak.

== Life History ==
Forbes's blackbird had an average lifespan of 4.6 years. It can eat insects, fruit and occasionally nectar from flowering plants or sugarcane. Its breeding season ranges from March to June, during the rainy season. Nests are most commonly found in mango trees (Mangifera indica). Egg clutch sizes can range between 1-4 eggs and it can have up to two clutches during the breeding season. After nest completion it can take anywhere between 4 and 10 days until egg laying starts. It is estimated that the population does not exceed 10,000 mature individuals.

=== Habitat and Range ===
Forbes's blackbird is a non-migratory species found in east and north-east Brazil in small and very fragmented habitats. Its natural habitats are subtropical or tropical moist lowland forest, subtropical or tropical seasonally wet or flooded lowland grassland, and plantations. The largest grouping found 150 individuals at Pedra Talhada, Alagoas. There are anywhere between 2-100 subpopulations, all of which are experiencing a continued decline of mature individuals. It has been found in small numbers around sugar cane plantations and pastures adjacent to forest patches and marshy areas. In the wild it primarily inhabits forest edge areas.

== Threats ==
The greatest threat to Forbes's blackbird is widespread habitat destruction and degradation. It is estimated that roughly 10% of forest from the species range was lost between 2000–2012. The degradation has even reduced the amount of forest edge habitat available. Much of the destroyed forest has been converted to sugar cane plantations which the local populations may be able to withstand. Decline in population size has also been attributed to reduced reproductive success due to brood parasitism from the shiny cowbird (Molothrus bonariensis). Nests observed from 1981-1986 has a parasitism rate of 64%, and in 1987 all nests studied were parasitized by the shiny cowbird. It has also been observed in trade due to confusion with the chopi blackbird which is valued in trade.

=== Conservation ===
Forbes's blackbird is officially recognized as Vulnerable in Brazil. It is legally protected in Rio Doce State Park and Pedra Telhada Biological Reserve where protection is enforced by guards, however the species mostly occur outside these areas. At Pedra Telhada experiments are being performed on destroying shiny cowbird eggs that have parasitized blackbird nests. Currently there are no further protections in place to protect this species.
