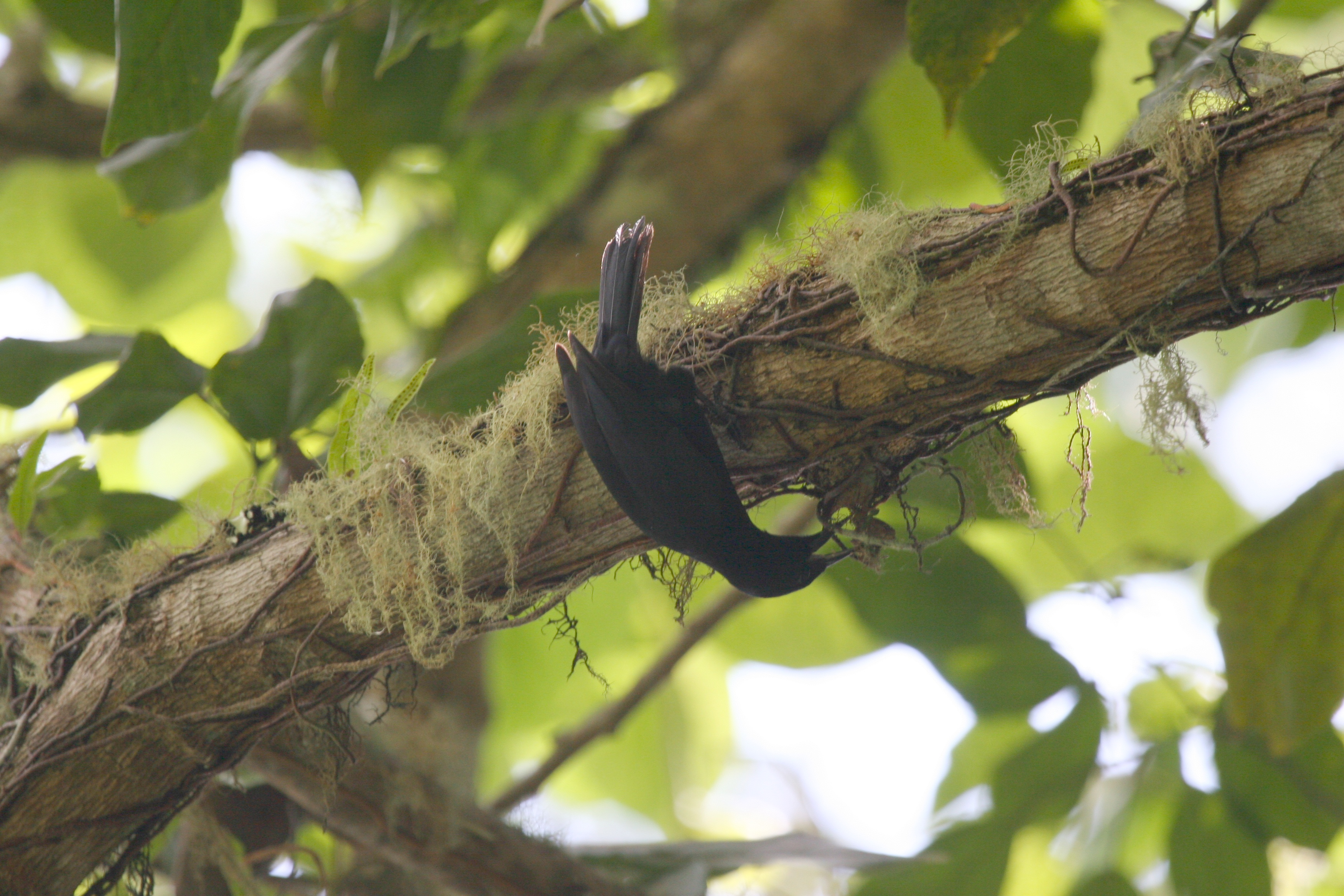

Conservation status
- Endangered (IUCN 3.1)

Scientific classification
- Kingdom: Animalia
- Phylum: Chordata
- Class: Aves
- Order: Passeriformes
- Family: Icteridae
- Genus: Nesopsar; P.L. Sclater, 1859
- Species: N. nigerrimus

Binomial name
- Nesopsar nigerrimus (Osburn, 1859)

= Jamaican blackbird =

Species of bird

The Jamaican blackbird (Nesopsar nigerrimus) is a species of bird in the New World blackbird and oriole family Icteridae. It is the only species (monotypic) in the genus Nesopsar. The species has sometimes been included in the genus Agelaius, but molecular systematics have shown it not be closely related to any living New World blackbird or grackle. The species is endemic to Jamaica, where it is restricted to Cockpit Country, some central areas and the Blue and John Crow Mountains.

== Description ==
The Jamaican blackbird is a small icterid with all black plumage. It has a short tail that is often flayed.

== Habitat ==
It is strictly arboreal and has a wheezing call. Pairs occupy large territories in a variety of wet montane forest types, including elfin and mist forests, that have substantial epiphytes and mosses on the trees. The Jamaican blackbird's habitats are confined to areas of above 575m and are rarely seen in lowland areas.

== Ecology ==
In the absence of specialised tree probers such as the woodcreepers, ovenbirds and woodpeckers (Jamaica does have a species of woodpecker, the Jamaican woodpecker, but it is a generalist that typically feeds away from tree trunks), which occur in similar forests on the mainland, the Jamaican blackbird has convergently evolved to fill this ecological niche. The majority of the food taken by this species is found on the trunks of trees and their inner branches, feeding on animal prey, mostly insects, which it finds in bark or in bromeliads. It has shorter legs and longer claws that typical icterids, uses its tail for support when climbing tree trunks, both of which are adaptations to its niche, and has a longer bill and stronger jaw muscles than other New World blackbirds used for probing, spreading and hammering. It utilises a different niche from the other (semi) endemic icterid, the Jamaican oriole, which forages mainly in the outer branches of the trees.

== Conservation ==
The principal threat to the Jamaican blackbird is habitat loss. There are numerous threats to Jamaican forests, including bauxite mining, charcoal production, forestry, farming and development. This species is particularly vulnerable because it is dependent on large trees which support many epiphytes. Because of these threats it is listed as Endangered by the IUCN. It is protected in the Blue and John Crow Mountains National Park, and efforts are underway to stop bauxite mining in Cockpit Country.
