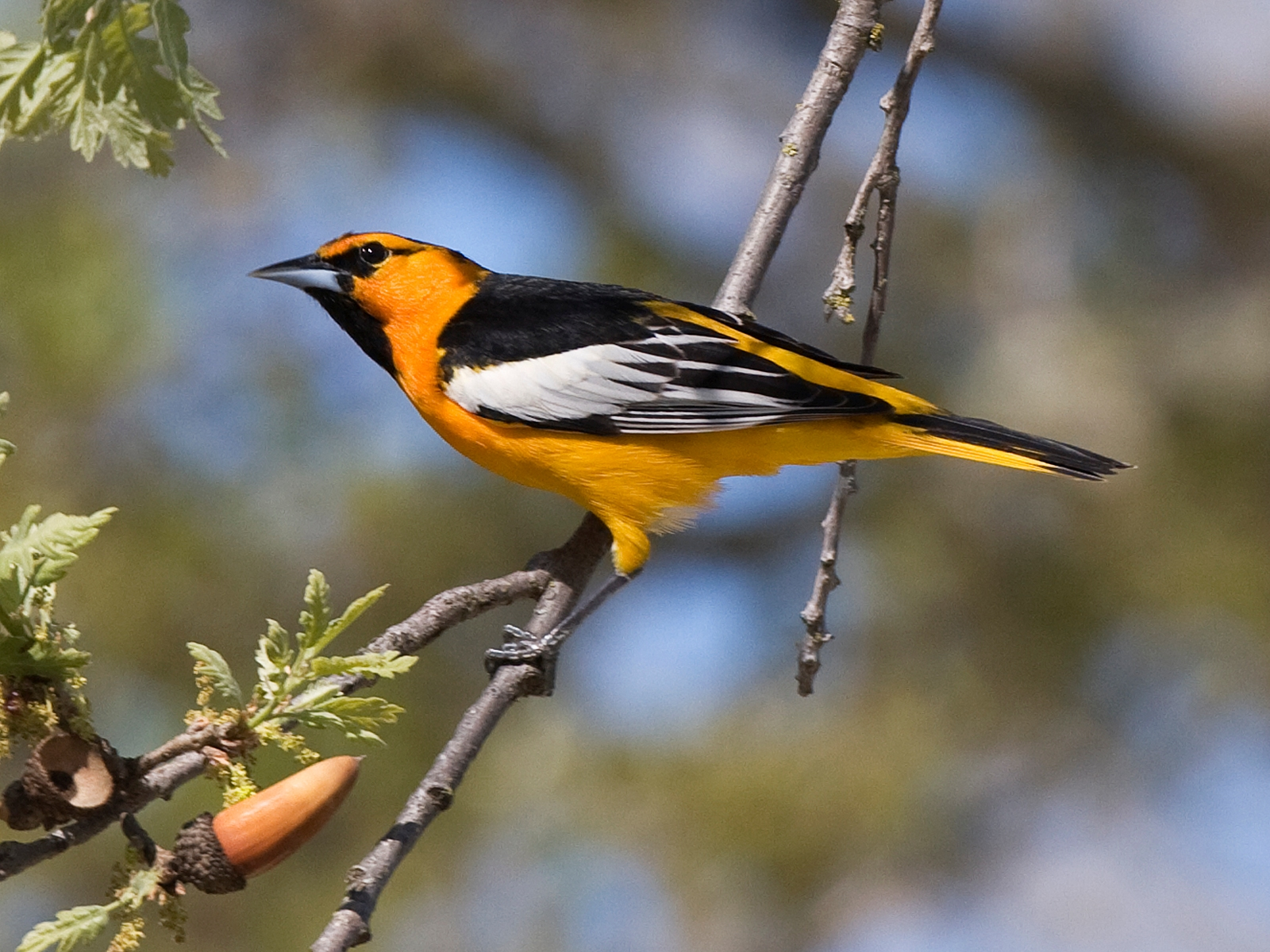
- Adult male Bullock's oriole

Scientific classification
- Kingdom: Animalia
- Phylum: Chordata
- Class: Aves
- Order: Passeriformes
- Superfamily: Emberizoidea
- Family: Icteridae; Vigors, 1825

Type genus
- Icterus Brisson, 1760

Genera
- 30, See text

= Icterid =

Icterids

Family of birds, often black with yellow, orange, or red markings

Icterids (/ˈɪktərɪd/) or New World blackbirds make up a family, the Icteridae (/ɪkˈtɛrɪdi/), of small to medium-sized, often colorful, New World passerine birds. The family contains 108 species and is divided into 30 genera. Most species have black as a predominant plumage color, often enlivened by yellow, orange, or red. The species in the family vary widely in size, shape, behavior, and coloration.

== Etymology ==
The name, meaning "jaundiced ones" (from the prominent yellow feathers of many species) comes from the Ancient Greek: ἴκτερος - íkteros via the Latin: ictericus.

=== Relationship to other species ===
This group includes the New World blackbirds, New World orioles, the bobolink, meadowlarks, grackles, cowbirds, oropendolas, and caciques. Despite the similar names, the first groups are only distantly related to the Old World common blackbird (a thrush) or to the Old World orioles. The Icteridae are not to be confused with the Icteriidae, a family created in 2017 and consisting of one species — the yellow-breasted chat (Icteria virens).

== Characteristics ==
Most icterid species live in the tropics, although many species also occur in temperate regions, such as the red-winged blackbird and the long-tailed meadowlark. The highest densities of breeding species are found in Colombia and southern Mexico. They inhabit a range of habitats, including scrub, swamp, forest, and savanna. Temperate species are migratory, with many species that nest in the United States and Canada moving south into Mexico and Central America.

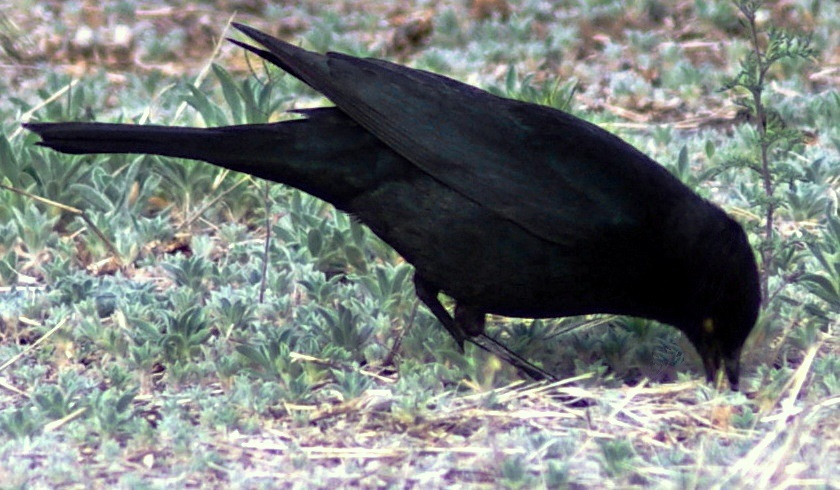
Breeding male Brewer's blackbird apparently gaping (see text) in soil

Icterids are variable in size, and often display considerable sexual dimorphism, with brighter coloration and greater size in males being typical. While such dimorphism is widely known in passerines, the sexual dimorphism by size is uniquely extreme in icterids. For example, the male great-tailed grackle is 60% heavier than the female. The smallest icterid species is the orchard oriole, in which the female averages 15 cm in length (6 in) and 18 g (0.040 lb) in weight, while the largest is the olive oropendola, the male of which measures 52 cm (20 in) and weighs about 550 g (1.21 lb). This variation is greater than in any other passerine family (unless the kinglet calyptura belongs with the cotingas, which would then have greater variation). One unusual morphological adaptation shared by the icterids is gaping, where the skull is configured to allow them to open their bills strongly rather than passively, allowing them to force open gaps to obtain otherwise hidden food. Most icterids have rounded tails and lack rictal bristles. They have nine primary feathers and are placed among the nine-primaried oscines.

Icterids have adapted to taking a wide range of foods. Oropendolas and caciques use their gaping motion to open the skins of fruit to obtain the soft insides, and have long bills adapted to the process. Others such as cowbirds and the bobolink have shorter, stubbier bills for crushing seeds. The Jamaican blackbird uses its bill to pry amongst tree bark and epiphytes, and has adopted the evolutionary niche filled elsewhere in the Neotropics by woodcreepers. Orioles drink nectar.

The nesting habits of these birds are also variable, including pendulous woven nests in the oropendolas and orioles. Many icterids are colonial, nesting in colonies of up to 100,000 birds. Some cowbird species engage in brood parasitism; females lay their eggs in the nests of other species, in a similar fashion to some cuckoos.

Some species of icterid have become agricultural pests; for example, red-winged blackbirds in the United States are considered the worst vertebrate pests on some crops, such as rice. The cost of controlling blackbirds in California was $30 per acre in 1994. Not all species have been as successful, and a number of species are threatened with extinction. These include insular forms such as the Jamaican blackbird, yellow-shouldered blackbird, and St Lucia oriole, all threatened by habitat loss; and the tricolored blackbird of California, which is threatened by habitat loss and destruction of nests.

== Folklore ==
Cacique and oropendola species are called paucar or similar names in Peru. As paucares are considered very intelligent, Native Americans feed the brains to their children to make them fast learners. As the male plays no part in nesting and care of the young, a man who does not work may be called a "male paucar".

== Taxonomy ==
The family group was introduced in 1825 as a subfamily Icterina by Irish zoologist Nicholas Vigors. He placed the subfamily in the starling family Sturnidae.

A phylogenetic analysis of the passerine families by Carl Oliveros and collaborators published in 2019 found that the family Icteridae was sister to the family Icteriidae (containing the yellow breasted chat) and together these two families formed a clade that was sister to the New World warbler family Parulidae.

- - Parulidae – New World warblers (120 species)
  - - Icteriidae – yellow breasted chat
    - Icteridae

The genus level cladogram shown below is based on a molecular phylogenetic study by Alexis Powell and collaborators that was published in 2014. The study compared mitochondrial gene sequences. The subfamilies are those that were proposed in 2016 by Van Remsen and collaborators. The numbers of species are taken from the list maintained by Frank Gill, Pamela Rasmussen and David Donsker on behalf of the International Ornithological Committee (IOC).

- Icteridae
  - - Xanthocephalinae
      Xanthocephalus – yellow-headed blackbird
    - - Dolichonychinae
        Dolichonyx – bobolink
      - Sturnellinae
        - Sturnella – meadow larks (3 species)
        - Leistes – blackbirds and meadowlarks (5 species)
  - - - Amblycercinae
        Amblycercus – yellow-billed cacique
      - Cassicinae
        - Cassiculus – Mexican cacique
        - - Psarocolius – oropendolas (9 species)
          - Cacicus – caciques (11 species)
    - - Icterinae
        Icterus – orioles (32 species)
      - Agelaiinae
        - - Nesopsar – Jamaican blackbird
          - Agelaius – (5 species)
        - - Molothrus – cowbirds (6 species)
          - - - Dives – blackbirds (2 species)
              - - Ptiloxena – Cuban blackbird
                - - Euphagus – blackbirds (2 species)
                  - Quiscalus – grackles (7 species)
            - - - - Lampropsar – velvet-fronted grackle
                  - Hypopyrrhus – red-bellied grackle
                - - Gymnomystax – oriole blackbird
                  - Macroagelaius – mountain grackles (2 species)
              - - - Amblyramphus – scarlet-headed blackbird
                  - Curaeus – austral blackbird
                - - Anumara – Forbes's blackbird
                  - - Gnorimopsar – chopi blackbird
                    - - - Agelaioides – baywings (2 species)
                        - Oreopsar – Bolivian blackbird
                      - - Agelasticus – blackbirds (3 species)
                        - - Chrysomus – blackbirds (2 species)
                          - - Xanthopsar – saffron-cowled blackbird
                            - Pseudoleistes – marshbirds (2 species)

== Genera ==
Image	Genus	Living species
	Xanthocephalus Bonaparte, 1850	Yellow-headed blackbird, Xanthocephalus xanthocephalus
	Dolichonyx Swainson, 1827	Bobolink, Dolichonyx oryzivorus
	Sturnella Vieillot, 1816	Western meadowlark, Sturnella neglecta; Eastern meadowlark, Sturnella magna; Lilian's meadowlark, Sturnella lilianae
	Leistes Vigors, 1825	Red-breasted meadowlark, Leistes militaris; White-browed meadowlark, Leistes superciliaris; Peruvian meadowlark, Leistes bellicosus; Long-tailed meadowlark, Leistes loyca; Pampas meadowlark, Leistes defilippii
	Amblycercus Cabanis, 1851	Yellow-billed cacique, Amblycercus holosericeus
	Cassiculus Swainson, 1827	Mexican cacique or yellow-winged cacique, Cassiculus melanicterus
	Psarocolius Wagler, 1827	Chestnut-headed oropendola, Psarocolius wagleri; Russet-backed oropendola, Psarocolius angustifrons; Dusky-green oropendola, Psarocolius atrovirens; Crested oropendola, Psarocolius decumanus; Green oropendola, Psarocolius viridis; Olive oropendola, Psarocolius bifasciatus; Montezuma oropendola, Psarocolius montezuma; Black oropendola, Psarocolius guatimozinus; Baudo oropendola, Psarocolius cassini
	Cacicus Lacepede, 1799	Solitary cacique, Cacicus solitarius; Golden-winged cacique, Cacicus chrysopterus; Selva cacique, Cacicus koepckeae; Ecuadorian cacique, Cacicus sclateri; Yellow-rumped cacique, Cacicus cela; Scarlet-rumped cacique, Cacicus microrhynchus; Subtropical cacique, Cacicus uropygialis; Mountain cacique, Cacicus chrysonotus; Band-tailed cacique, Cacicus latirostris; Casqued cacique, Cacicus oseryi; Red-rumped cacique, Cacicus haemorrhous
	Icterus Brisson, 1760	32 species
	Nesopsar P.L. Sclater, 1859	Jamaican blackbird, Nesopsar nigerrimus
	Agelaius Vieillot, 1816	Yellow-shouldered blackbird, Agelaius xanthomus; Tawny-shouldered blackbird, Agelaius humeralis; Tricolored blackbird, Agelaius tricolor; Red-winged blackbird, Agelaius phoeniceus; Red-shouldered blackbird, Agelaius assimilis
	Molothrus Swainson, 1832	Screaming cowbird, Molothrus rufoaxillaris; Giant cowbird, Molothrus oryzivorus; Shiny cowbird, Molothrus bonariensis; Bronzed cowbird, Molothrus aeneus; Bronze-brown cowbird, Molothrus armenti; Brown-headed cowbird, Molothrus ater
	Dives Cassin, 1867	Scrub blackbird, Dives warczewiczi; Melodious blackbird, Dives dives
	Ptiloxena Chapman, 1892	Cuban blackbird, Ptiloxena atroviolacea
	Euphagus Cassin, 1867	Rusty blackbird, Euphagus carolinus; Brewer's blackbird, Euphagus cyanocephalus
	Quiscalus Vieillot, 1816	Common grackle, Quiscalus quiscula; Nicaraguan grackle, Quiscalus nicaraguensis; Carib grackle, Quiscalus lugubris; Greater Antillean grackle, Quiscalus niger; Boat-tailed grackle, Quiscalus major; Great-tailed grackle, Quiscalus mexicanus; † Slender-billed grackle, Quiscalus palustris
	Hypopyrrhus Bonaparte, 1850	Red-bellied grackle, Hypopyrrhus pyrohypogaster
	Lampropsar Cabanis, 1847	Velvet-fronted grackle, Lampropsar tanagrinus
	Gymnomystax Reichenbach, 1850	Oriole blackbird, Gymnomystax mexicanus
	Macroagelaius Cassin, 1866	Colombian mountain grackle, Macroagelaius subalaris; Golden-tufted mountain grackle, Macroagelaius imthurni
	Curaeus PL Sclater, 1862	Austral blackbird, Curaeus curaeus
	Amblyramphus Leach, 1814	Scarlet-headed blackbird, Amblyramphus holosericeus
	Anumara Powell et al., 2014	Forbes's blackbird, Anumara forbesi
	Gnorimopsar Richmond, 1908	Chopi blackbird, Gnorimopsar chopi
	Oreopsar WL Sclater, 1939	Bolivian blackbird, Oreopsar bolivianus
	Agelaioides Cassin, 1866	Grayish baywing, Agelaioides badius; Pale baywing, Agelaioides fringillarius
	Agelasticus Cabanis, 1851	Yellow-winged blackbird, Agelasticus thilius; Pale-eyed blackbird, Agelasticus xanthophthalmus; Unicolored blackbird, Agelasticus cyanopus
	Chrysomus Swainson, 1837	Chestnut-capped blackbird, Chrysomus ruficapillus; Yellow-hooded blackbird, Chrysomus icterocephalus
	Xanthopsar Ridgway, 1901	Saffron-cowled blackbird, Xanthopsar flavus
	Pseudoleistes P.L. Sclater, 1862	Brown-and-yellow marshbird, Pseudoleistes virescens; Yellow-rumped marshbird, Pseudoleistes guirahuro

Prehistoric icterid genera that have been described from Pleistocene fossil remains are Pandanaris from Rancho La Brea and Pyelorhamphus from Shelter Cave.
