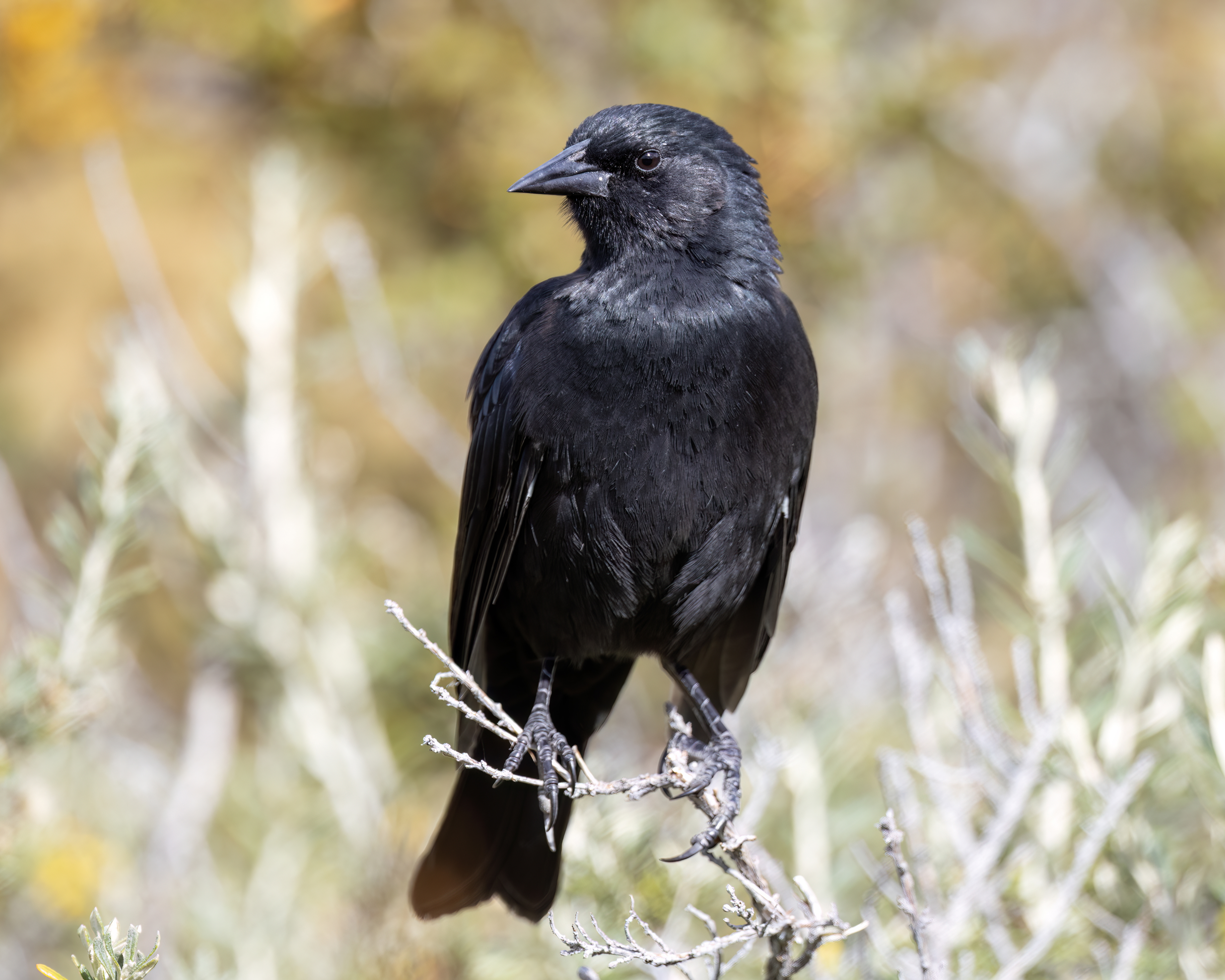

Conservation status
- Least Concern (IUCN 3.1)

Scientific classification
- Kingdom: Animalia
- Phylum: Chordata
- Class: Aves
- Order: Passeriformes
- Family: Icteridae
- Genus: Curaeus; PL Sclater, 1862
- Species: C. curaeus

Binomial name
- Curaeus curaeus (Molina, 1782)

= Austral blackbird =

Species of bird

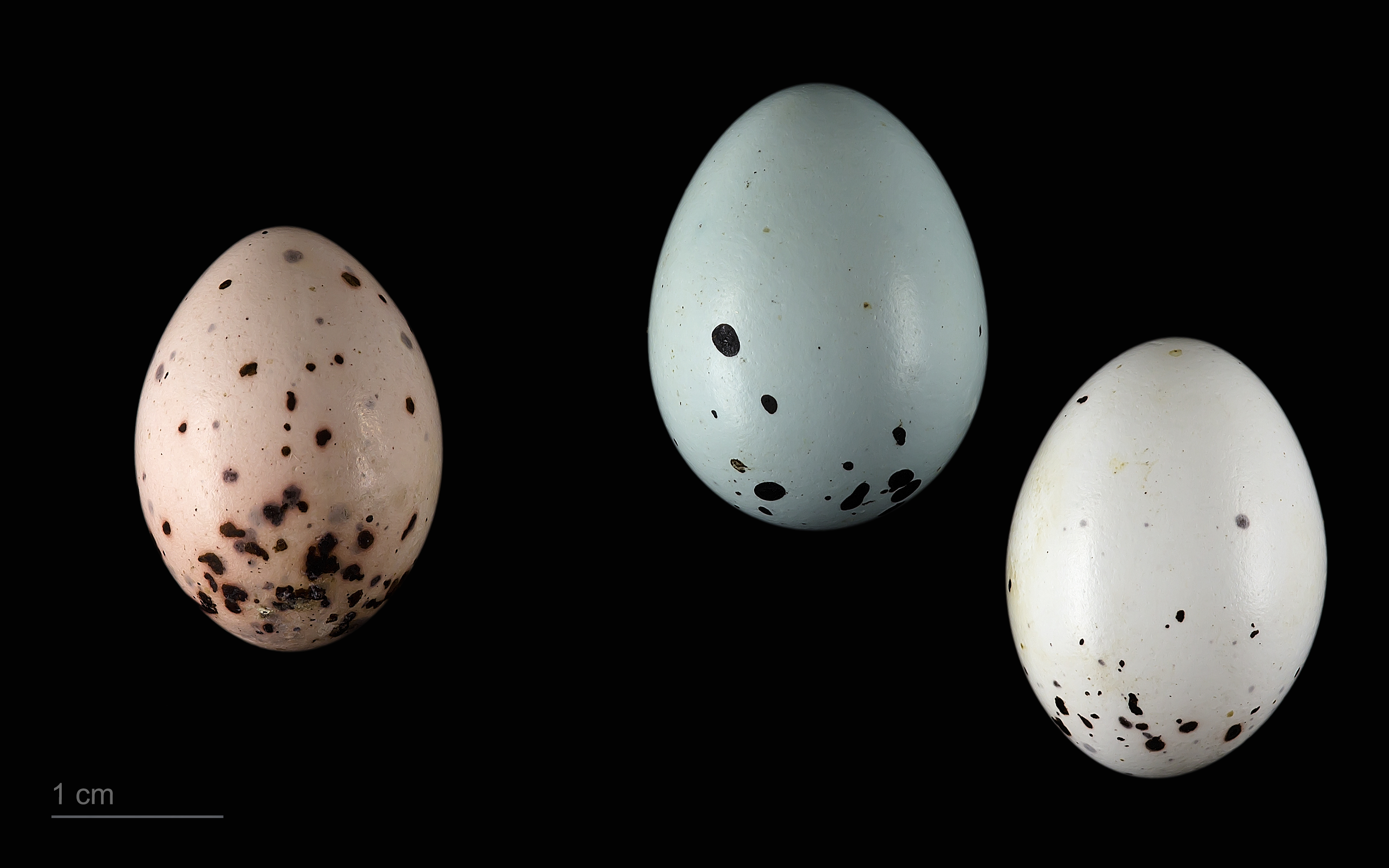
Molothrus bonariensis in a clutch of Curaeus curaeus - MHNT

The austral blackbird (Curaeus curaeus) is a species of bird in the family Icteridae. It is found in Argentina and Chile, and it migrates to regions close by. Its natural habitats are temperate forests, subtropical or tropical high-altitude shrubland, and heavily degraded former forest.

== Description ==
Its plumage is entirely black with a slight bluish hint, and its physical features consist of black legs, black eyes, and a sharp beak with missing pigmentation in the head, chest, and wings. Compared to other birds in its family, the Austral Blackbird has a highly varied voice, and they do a lot of singing and calling together.

== Habitat ==
Their main habitats are woodlands, forests, lakeshores, beaches, fields, valley bottoms, and rocky shores. It is commonly found in small flocks of 6 to 20 in and around the forest, and never in the open land. Can be commonly found in protected areas in national parks around Chile and Argentina. They are found in protected areas where the conditions support proper living and breeding.

== Diet ==
They are typically drawn to nectar and like feeding on different kinds of flowers. When the bird feeds on these plants it will create a yellow color from the nectar around their head and face that changes its look to the viewer's eye. They are considered omnivores and like feeding on seeds such as oats and wheat. They also like to eat wild fruits and regular fruits such as cherries and grapes.

== Population & Migration ==
Its population size and trend have remained stable, and the bird is not endangered as they are considered Least Concern with no current threats to their species. Its migration patterns are largely resident and they migrate to west-central Argentina, and on the Atlantic coast of Patagonia. Their exact population size is unknown but is under 10,000.

== Breeding ==
The breeding season for the Austral Blackbird takes place between the months of October and December, and it is done in their nests made from plants and mud. They have nests located in Argentina with incubated eggs, and recently hatched chicks in mid-December. They only prefer to nest in habitats on hills usually found in trees in the forest and not open urban areas. They also have nests in Chile with 3 to 6 eggs made out of twigs, grass stems, bamboo leaves, and mud.
