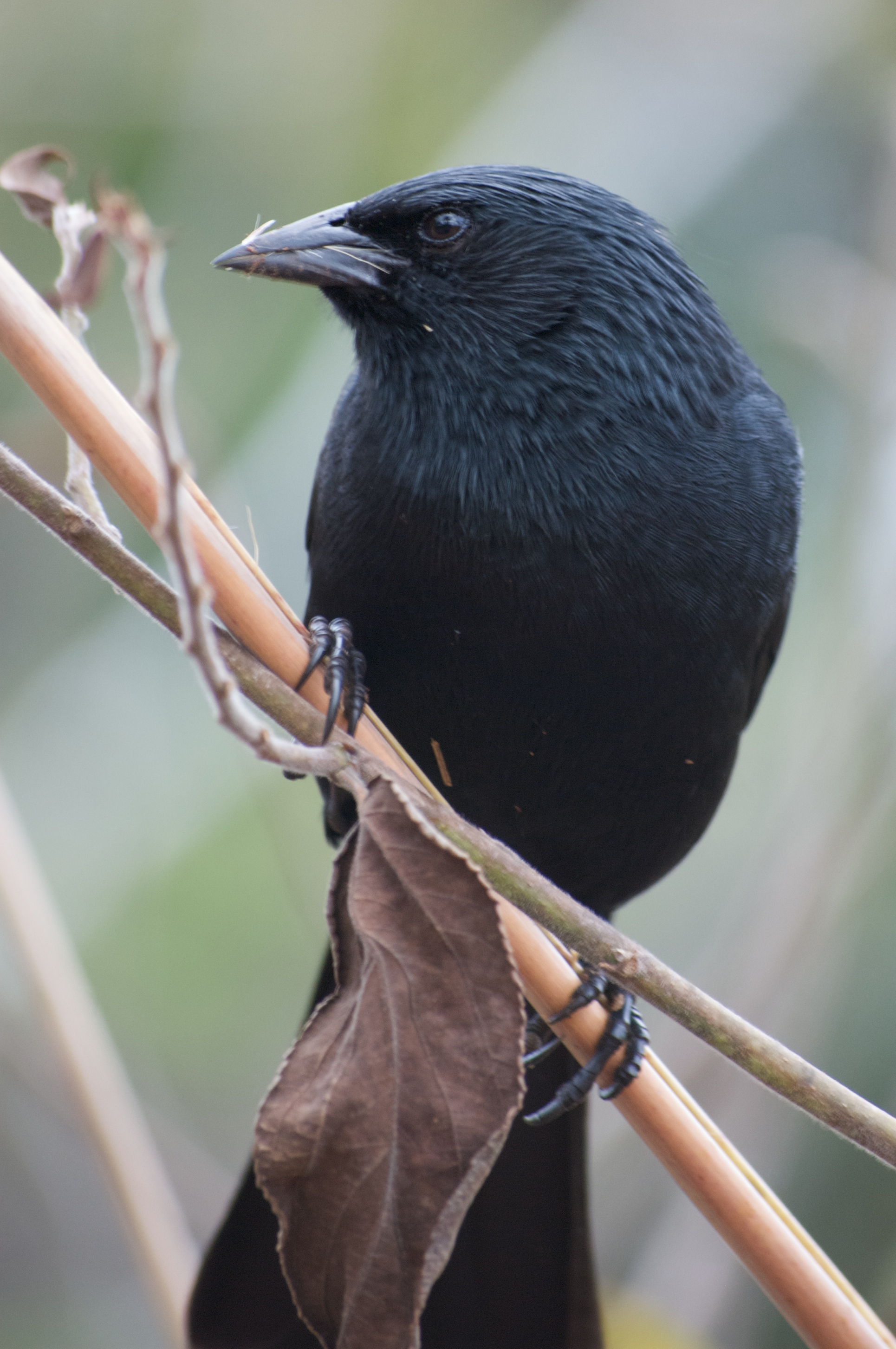

Conservation status
- Least Concern (IUCN 3.1)

Scientific classification
- Kingdom: Animalia
- Phylum: Chordata
- Class: Aves
- Order: Passeriformes
- Family: Icteridae
- Genus: Gnorimopsar; Richmond, 1908
- Species: G. chopi

Binomial name
- Gnorimopsar chopi (Vieillot, 1819)

Synonyms
- Agelaius chopi Vieillot, 1819; Icterus sulcirostris Spix, 1824; Aphobus megistus Leverkühn, 1889

= Chopi blackbird =

Species of bird

The chopi blackbird (Gnorimopsar chopi) is a species of passerine bird belonging to the family Icteridae, which contains the New World blackbirds, grackles, New World orioles and related species. It is the only species in the monospecific genus Gnorimopsar. This species is found in South America south of the Amazon rainforest.

== Taxonomy ==
The chopi blackbird was first formally described as Agelaius chopi in 1819 by the French ornithologist Louis Pierre Vieillot with its type locality given as "Paraguay to Buenos Aires", the type locality was descignated as Paraguay in 1962 by Cuello and Gerzenstein. In 1908 Charles Wallace Richmond proposed the new genus Gnorimopsar to replace the previous name Aaptus, which in turn he had proposed to replace Aphobus, which was preoccuppied by Aphobus Gistel, 1848 in Actinopterygii. The genus Gnorimopsar is placed in the subfamily Agelaiinae, the New World blackbirds, of the family Icteridae.

=== Subspecies ===
The chopi blackbird has two subspecies:

- G. chopi chopi (Vieillot, 1919) - south east Bolivia, central and south eastern Brazil to Uruguay and northeastern Argentina.
- G. chopi sulcirostris (Spix, 1824) - eastern Bolivia and northwestern Argentina with a disjunct population in northeastern Brazil.

A third subspecues, G. c. megistus (Leverkuhn, 1889) has been recognized in the past with G. c. sulcirostris being confined to northeastern Brazil.

== Etymology ==
The chopi blackbird's common name and its specific name, chopi, are onomatopoeic, being derived from its common vocalisation which is sometimes writtens as "chop-ee".

== Description ==
The chopi blackbird is 25 cm (9.8 in) in length and has black plumage across the body. It is similar to the Forbes's blackbird but has a slightly curved bill with a groove along the lower mandible. The call is a loud explosive "tjouw", either given as a single call or as a series that vary randomly in pitch.

== Distribution ==
The Chopi blackbird is found from the extreme sout east of Peru in Madre de Dios east through the lowlands of northern and eastern Bolivia, Paraguay, Brazil south of the Amazon, Uruguay and northern and eastern Argentina.

== Habitat ==
The chopi blackbird occurs in various habitats, foraging mainly in the ground but it readily ascends into the trees to feed. This species can be found in open forest, swamp forest, forest edge, palm stands and groves of Araucaria angustifolia.

== Behavior ==
The chopi blackbird is a gregarious species and is typically noted in flocks, which may reach large sizes. They roost in large aggregations in dense foliage and cane brakes. These flocks are highly vocal, the birds singing as if holding conversations, even in flight. When nesting they will aggressively defend the nest site from predators, unhestitatngly chasing hawks and caracaras. It is a semi-colonial species, nesting in cavities, nests stites include old woodpecker holes, hollow trees, cavities in fence posts disuesed rufous hornero nests, within the nests of jabiru storks, the dense foliage of Auracaria angustifolia, holes in banks and termite nests, and under the eaves and older parts of houses. When not nesting in a cavity the chopi black bird builds an open cup nest among the dense foliage of palms and other trees. The clutch size is 4 or 5 eggs, the chopi blackbird is a host for the shiny cowbird and screaming cowbird.
