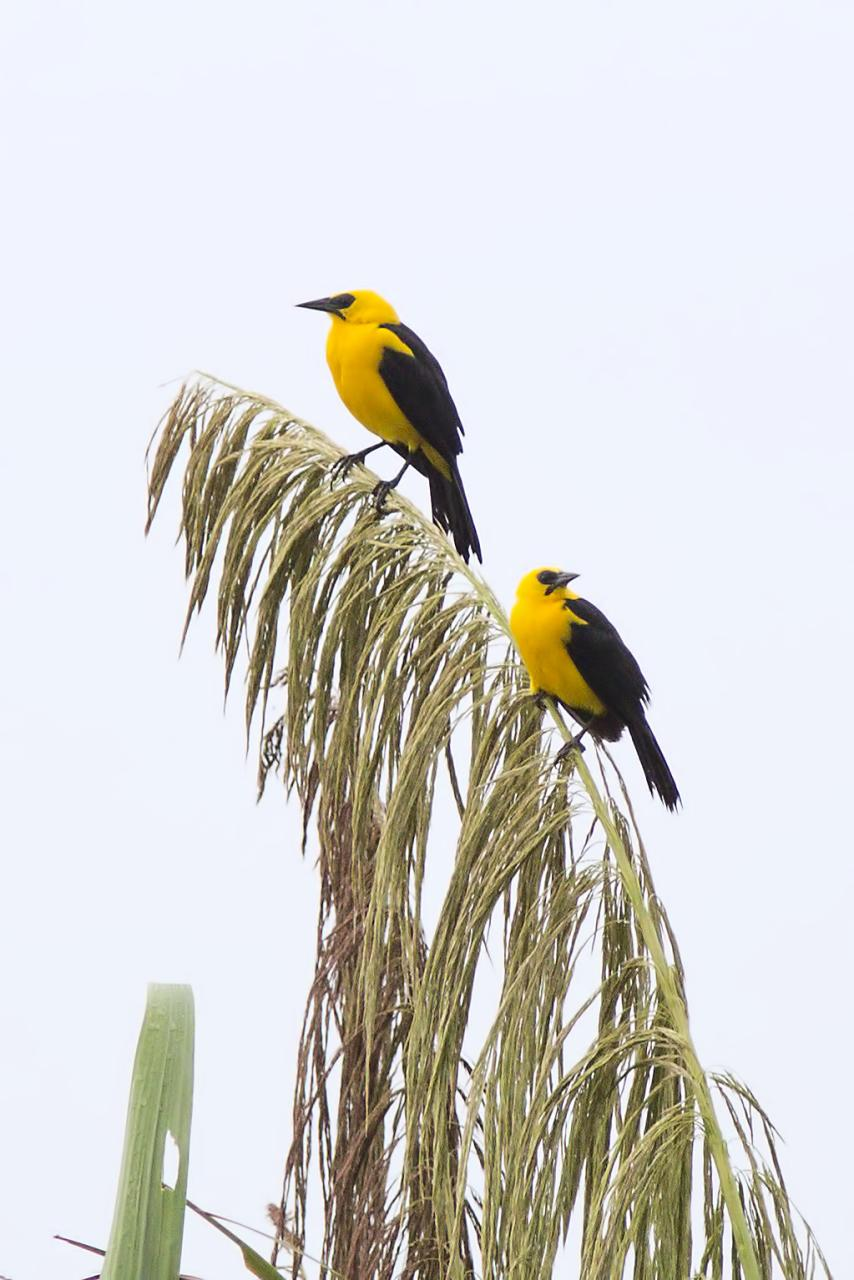
- In Peru

Conservation status
- Least Concern (IUCN 3.1)

Scientific classification
- Kingdom: Animalia
- Phylum: Chordata
- Class: Aves
- Order: Passeriformes
- Family: Icteridae
- Genus: Gymnomystax; Reichenbach, 1850
- Species: G. mexicanus

Binomial name
- Gymnomystax mexicanus (Linnaeus, 1766)

Synonyms
- Oriolus mexicanus Linnaeus, 1766

= Oriole blackbird =

Species of bird

The oriole blackbird (Gymnomystax mexicanus) is a species of bird in the family Icteridae. Its genus, Gymnomystax, is monotypic. It is a medium-sized yellow and black bird found in Brazil, Colombia, Ecuador, French Guiana, Guyana, Peru, Suriname, and Venezuela, where its natural habitats are subtropical or tropical moist lowland forest, subtropical or tropical moist shrubland, subtropical or tropical seasonally wet or flooded lowland grassland, and swamps.

== Taxonomy ==
In 1760 the French zoologist Mathurin Jacques Brisson included a description of the oriole blackbird in his Ornithologie based on a specimen which he mistakenly believed had been collected in New Spain. He used the French name Le troupiale brun de la Nouvelle Espagne and the Latin Icterus Fuscus Novae Hispaniae. Although Brisson coined Latin names, these do not conform to the binomial system and are not recognised by the International Commission on Zoological Nomenclature. When in 1766 the Swedish naturalist Carl Linnaeus updated his Systema Naturae for the twelfth edition, he added 240 species that had been previously described by Brisson. One of these was the oriole blackbird. Linnaeus included a brief description, coined the binomial name Oriolus mexicanus, cited Brisson's work and gave the type location as Mexico. The type location was subsequently designated as Cayenne in French Guiana. This species is now the only member of the genus Gymnomystax that was introduced by the German naturalist Ludwig Reichenbach in 1850. The name Gymnomystax combines the Ancient Greek words gumnos "bare" and mustax "moustache". The species is monotypic.

== Description ==
The oriole blackbird grows to a length of nearly 30 cm (12 in). The sexes are similar in appearance. The head, neck, shoulders and underparts are bright yellow; the back, wings, rump and tail are black, apart from the lower wing-coverts showing a strip of yellow. The eye is brown and is surrounded by a black eye ring, and the large bill and feet are blackish. The voice consists of several loud, scratchy calls, uttered from elevated perches or emitted when on the wing. One is a screech that resembles the sound made by a rusty hinge.

== Distribution and habitat ==
This icterid is found in the northern part of South America. Its range includes French Guiana, Guyana, Suriname, Venezuela, Colombia, Ecuador, Peru and northern Brazil. Its typical habitat is grassy areas with isolated trees near rivers, marshes, islands in rivers and gallery forest.

== Ecology ==
The oriole blackbird is usually seen in pairs or small groups but does not form mixed species flocks. It perches in prominent positions on small trees or on the top of bushes and forages mostly on the ground, especially in muddy areas near water. They feed on invertebrates such as earthworms, caterpillars and winged insects, as well as frogs and fruit, and sometimes tear open ripening maize cobs to feed on the seeds.

Breeding takes place in May and June. The nest is a cup-shaped structure about 17 cm (7 in) in diameter, loosely woven out of dry grass and weed stems, and lined with rootlets. The eggs are pale blue with black, brown and lilac blotches and spots. The shiny cowbird, a brood parasite, sometimes lays its egg in an oriole blackbird's nest. The incubation period is about 18 days and the incubation is done solely by the female. Both parents join in feeding the chicks with small invertebrates and frogs which are not regurgitated but brought whole to the nest in the parent's beak.

== Status ==
G. mexicanus is a fairly common species and has a very extensive range. Its total population has not been estimated but its population trend seems to be steady. For these reasons, the International Union for Conservation of Nature has assessed its conservation status as being of "least concern".
