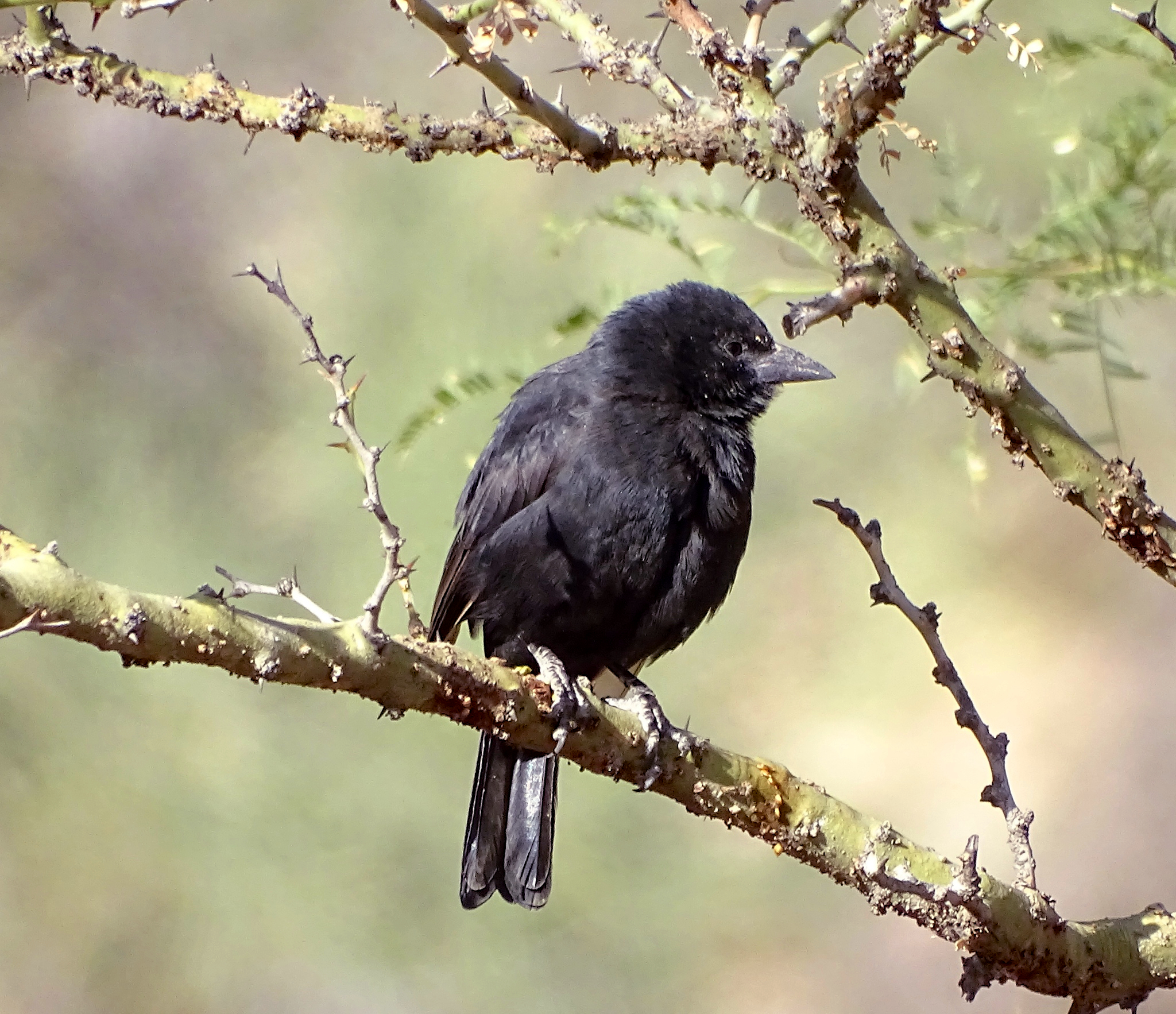

Conservation status
- Least Concern (IUCN 3.1)

Scientific classification
- Kingdom: Animalia
- Phylum: Chordata
- Class: Aves
- Order: Passeriformes
- Family: Icteridae
- Genus: Oreopsar; Sclater, WL, 1939
- Species: O. bolivianus

Binomial name
- Oreopsar bolivianus WL Sclater, 1939

Synonyms
- See text

= Bolivian blackbird =

Species of bird

The Bolivian blackbird (Oreopsar bolivianus) is a species of bird in the family Icteridae, the oropendolas, New World orioles, and New World blackbirds. It is endemic to Bolivia.

== Taxonomy and systematics ==
The Bolivian blackbird was formally described in 1939 with its current binomial Oreopsar bolivianus. A 2001 publication suggested that its genus be merged into Agelaioides. Doing so would have required that its binomial be Agelaioides oreopsar because Agelaioides bolivianus applied at the time to another species. The proposal was not accepted by major taxonomic systems. However, strong evidence suggests that its closest relative is the greyish baywing (Agelaioides badius).

The Bolivian blackbird is the only member of its genus and has no subspecies.

== Description ==
The Bolivian blackbird is about 23 cm (9 in) long. Males weigh an average of 73.5 g (2.6 oz) and females 66.2 g (2.3 oz). The species' bill has a decurved culmen. Adults of both sexes have the same almost entirely black plumage with little iridescence. Their flight feathers are sepia-brown which readily shows in flight. They have a brown iris, a gray bill, and dusky gray legs and feet. Juveniles are similar to adults but have a brownish tinge on their upperwing coverts and their underparts.

== Distribution and habitat ==
The Bolivian blackbird is found on the eastern side of the Andes primarily in the south-central Bolivian departments of Cochabamba, Potosí, and Chuquisaca. It is suspected but not confirmed to also occur in La Paz and Oruro departments. It inhabits dry valleys between sub-ranges of the Andes, especially those with tall columnar cactus, but also in open woodlands, scrublands, and irrigated croplands. It usually is near cliffs that it uses for nesting. In elevation it ranges between 1,400 and 3,500 m (4,600 and 11,500 ft).

== Behavior ==
=== Movement ===
The Bolivian blackbird is a year-round resident.

=== Feeding ===
The Bolivian blackbird feeds on insects, other arthropods, seeds of wild plants and crops, and cactus fruits. It usually forages in flocks of up to about 20 individuals that may include other icterid species. It mostly forages on the ground, often by probing soil, but also takes prey from tree and shrub leaves and branches.

=== Breeding ===
The Bolivian blackbird's breeding season has not been fully defined but includes April. Its nest is a cup made from plant fibers and, uniquely among icterids, is placed in a niche or crevice in a cliff. The clutch is three eggs that are pale greenish gray with brown and black markings. The incubation period and time to fledging are not known. The species is a cooperative breeder and several adults may provision one brood of nestlings.

=== Vocalization ===
The Bolivian blackbird's song is "a simple sequence of short chip notes interspersed with chip-it notes". Its contact call is chu-pee and its flight call is pee.

== Status ==
The IUCN has assessed the Bolivian blackbird as being of Least Concern. Its population size is not known but is believed to be stable. No immediate threats have been identified. It is "[l]ocally common in suitable habitat [and] [t]olerates some habitat disturbance". It occurs in at least one national park.
