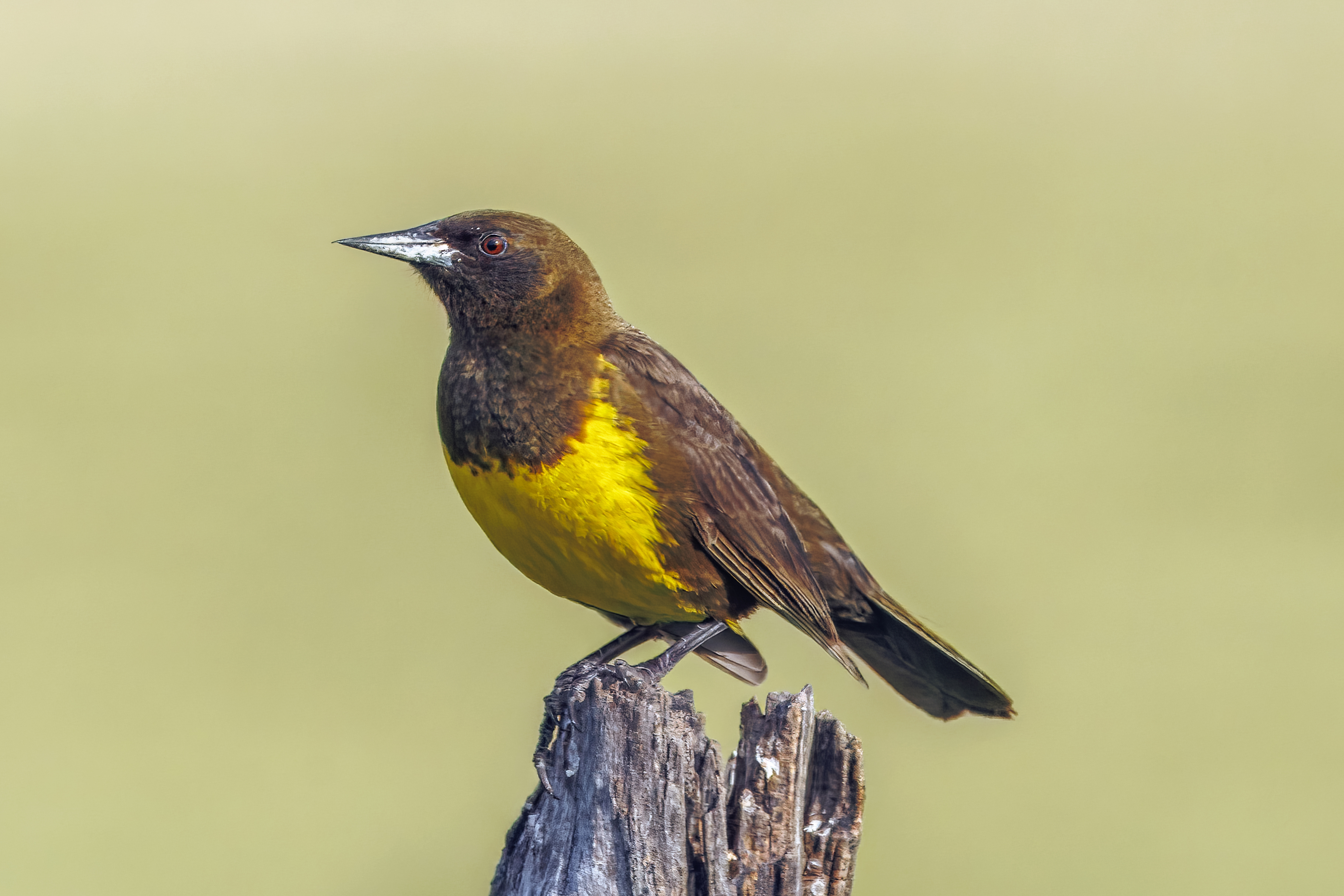
- At Colonia, Uruguay

Conservation status
- Least Concern (IUCN 3.1)

Scientific classification
- Kingdom: Animalia
- Phylum: Chordata
- Class: Aves
- Order: Passeriformes
- Family: Icteridae
- Genus: Pseudoleistes
- Species: P. virescens

Binomial name
- Pseudoleistes virescens (Vieillot, 1819)

= Brown-and-yellow marshbird =

Species of bird

The brown-and-yellow marshbird (Pseudoleistes virescens) is a species of bird in the family Icteridae, the oropendolas, New World orioles, and New World blackbirds. It is found in Argentina, Brazil, Uruguay, and as a vagrant in Paraguay.

== Taxonomy and systematics ==
The brown-and-yellow marshbird was formally described in 1819 with the binomial Agelaius virescens. It now shares the genus Pseudoleistes with the yellow-rumped marshbird (P. guirahuro).

The brown-and-yellow marshbird is monotypic.

== Description ==
The brown-and-yellow marshbird averages 24 cm (9.4 in) long. Males weigh an average of 79.6 g (2.8 oz) and females average 72.9 g (2.6 oz). The sexes have the same plumage. Adults are mostly deep brown to olive brown. Their upperwing coverts and the bend of the wing are rich yellow that usually only shows in flight. Their lower breast and belly are rich yellow. Both sexes have a brown iris, a blackish bill, and blackish legs and feet. Juveniles are similar to adults but with a yellowish throat, a yellow and brownish striped breast, and a yellowish mandible.

== Distribution and habitat ==
The brown-and-yellow marshbird is found in far southern Brazil's Santa Catarina and Rio Grande do Sul states and most of Uruguay, and from there south in Argentina just into Río Negro Province and as far west as San Luis Province. It has also occurred in far southern Paraguay's Ñeembucú Department as a vagrant. It inhabits marshes, wet grasslands, pastures, and cultivated fields. It roosts in tall emergent marsh vegetation and in tall grass on land. It is primarily a bird of the lowlands, reaching only 300 m (1,000 ft) in Brazil, but has been seen in the non-breeding season as high as 2,100 m (6,900 ft) in Argentina.

== Behavior ==
=== Movement ===
The brown-and-yellow marshbird is not a conventional migrant but in the non-breeding season flocks roam widely, perhaps in response to floods. It appears only irregularly in northwestern Argentina.

=== Feeding ===
The brown-and-yellow marshbird feeds mostly on insects and other arthropods like spiders with lesser numbers of small vertebrates and seeds as well. It forages on the ground, where it probes soil, and in low vegetation. It will turn over cow dung and other objects seeking prey. It usually forages in flocks that in the non-breeding season can number 50 individuals and include other icterids. Some flock members remain alert as sentinels.

=== Breeding ===
The brown-and-yellow marshbird breeds between August and December in Argentina. It is a cooperative breeder; up to six helpers have been noted at a nest. It nests in small colonies and does not appear to be territorial. The female does most nest building, making a cup from plant material and mud lined with fine fibers. It is typically placed near the ground in pampas grass, marsh vegetation like cat-tails, or in a small shrub or tree. The clutch is three to six eggs that are white with reddish brown markings. The female alone incubates, for about 14 days, and is fed by the male. Fledging occurs 11 to 12 days after hatch; both parents and the helpers provision nestlings. Both the shiny cowbird (Moluthrus bonariensis) and screaming cowbird (M. rufoaxillaris) are common brood parasites.

=== Vocalization ===
The brown-and-yellow marshbird's song is "a series of screechy chattering notes mixed with ascending or (rarely) descending whistles". Both sexes make "a loud repeated chrrr-wéé" call, often in a group even when flying. The species' alarm call is "a loud wooden rattle".

== Status ==
The IUCN has assessed the brown-and-yellow marshbird as being of Least Concern. It has a large range; its population size is not known but is believed to be stable. No immediate threats have been identified. It is "[c]ommon and rather widespread, particularly in [east-central] Argentina and Uruguay and "common to frequent" in Brazil. It occurs in several protected areas and "seems quite tolerant of moderate human disturbances".
