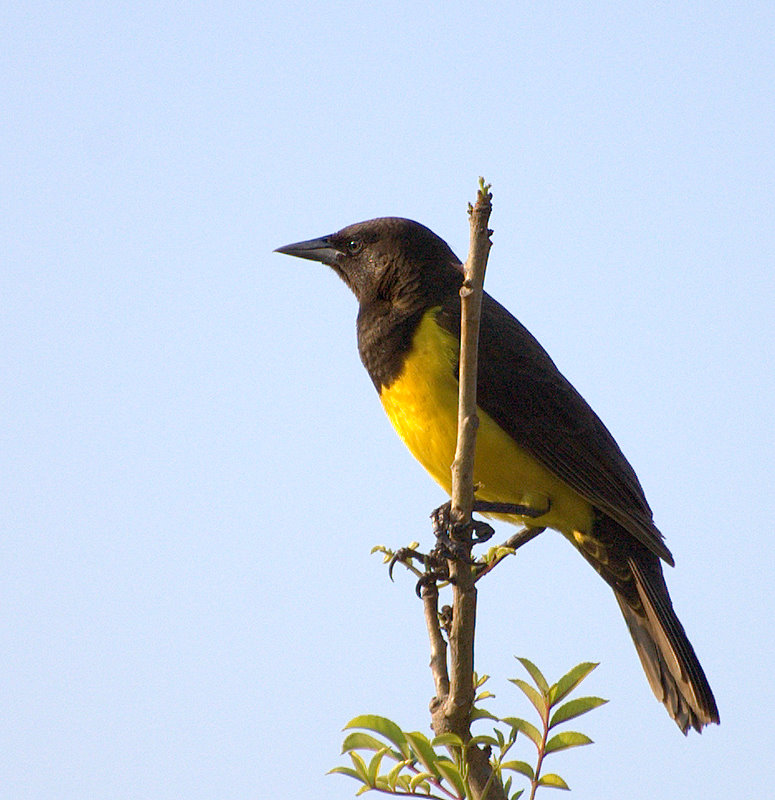
- Yellow-rumped marshbird (Pseudoleistes guirahuro)

Scientific classification
- Kingdom: Animalia
- Phylum: Chordata
- Class: Aves
- Order: Passeriformes
- Family: Icteridae
- Genus: Pseudoleistes; P.L. Sclater, 1862

Type species
- Pseudoleistes viridis P.L. Sclater, 1862

Species
- Pseudoleistes guirahuro Pseudoleistes virescens

= Pseudoleistes =

Genus of birds

The marshbirds, Pseudoleistes, are a small genus of icterid birds (family Icteridae).

The genus contains the following two species:

Genus Pseudoleistes – P.L. Sclater, 1862 – two species
Common name	Scientific name and subspecies	Range	Size and ecology	IUCN status and estimated population
Yellow-rumped marshbird	Pseudoleistes guirahuro (Vieillot, 1819)	Argentina, Brazil, Paraguay, and Uruguay	Size: Habitat: Diet:	LC
Brown-and-yellow marshbird	Pseudoleistes virescens (Vieillot, 1819)	Paraguay	Size: Habitat: Diet:	LC
