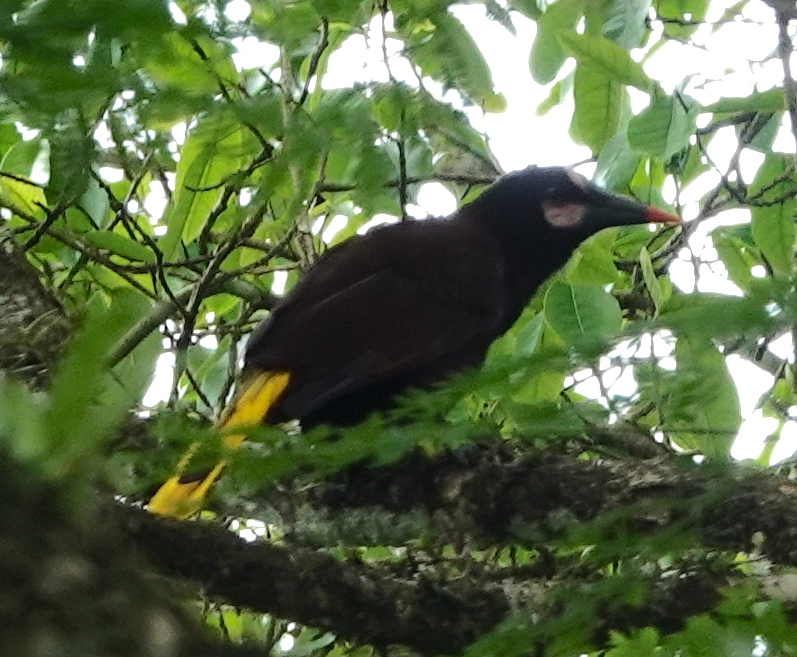

Conservation status
- Vulnerable (IUCN 3.1)

Scientific classification
- Kingdom: Animalia
- Phylum: Chordata
- Class: Aves
- Order: Passeriformes
- Family: Icteridae
- Genus: Psarocolius
- Species: P. cassini

Binomial name
- Psarocolius cassini (Richmond, 1898)

Synonyms
- see text

= Baudó oropendola =

Baudo oropendola

Species of bird

The Baudo oropendola (Note: The IOC and other taxonomic systems spell the English name with no diacritics. The IOC is the Wikipedia standard for bird names.) (Psarocolius cassini) is a Vulnerable species of bird in the family Icteridae, the oropendolas, New World orioles, and New World blackbirds. It is endemic to Colombia.

== Taxonomy and systematics ==
The Baudo oropendola was formally described in 1898 with the binomial Gymnostinops cassini. The genus Gymnostinops was later merged into the current Psarocolius. Some authors have suggested that the Baudo oropendola, the black oropendola (P. guatimozinus), and the olive oropendola (P. bifasciatus) should be merged as a single species.

The Baudo oropendola is monotypic.

== Description ==
Male Baudo oropendolas are about 46 cm (18 in) long and females about 39.5 cm (16 in). The sexes are similar though females are smaller than males and have duller plumage. Adults have a mostly black head, breast, and belly. They have a patch of bare pinkish skin on their face and a pink wattle at the base of the bill. Their back, rump, wings, flanks, and crissum are chestnut. Their tail's central pair of feathers are black and the rest yellow; because the black ones are shorter than the others the tail often looks completely yellow from below. They have a large bill with a swollen casque; it is mostly black with an orange tip. They have a brown iris and blackish legs and feet. The similar black oropendola, with which there is some range overlap, has a crest, blue facial skin, and chestnut wings.

== Distribution and habitat ==
The Baudo oropendola is found only in northwestern Colombia. Its main range is in the Serranía del Baudó and Serranía del Saltos in Chocó Department and slightly into far northwestern Antioquia Department. A very small isolated population is found to the southeast on the border of east-central Chocó and western Risaralda departments. Though its overall range is about 31,300 km^{2} (12,100 sq mi), its actual area of occupancy is about 2,460 km^{2} (950 sq mi). The Baudo oropendola is primarily a bird of humid lowland and foothill forest. Though it appears to favor primary forest with some openings and tall emergent trees it also occurs in secondary forest. It has been observed along rivers and in forest on sandy soils. In elevation it is found below about 400 m (1,300 ft).

== Behavior ==
=== Movement ===
As best is known, the Baudo oropendola is a year-round resident.

=== Feeding ===
The Baudo oropendola's diet has not been studied but is known to include insects and fruit. It apparently feeds mostly in the forest canopy in flocks of up to about 10 to 12 individuals. It has been observed foraging with chestnut-headed oropendolas (P. wagleri).

=== Breeding ===
Sources differ on the Baudo oropendola's breeding season. One says it spans at least January to March and another says May and June. Its nest is a long bag or purse made from coarse plant fibers. Nothing else is known about the species' breeding biology.

=== Vocalization ===
The Baudo oropendola's vocalizations have not been described but appear to be similar to those of the black oropendola and Montezuma oropendola (P. montezuma): see here and here respectively.

== Status ==
The IUCN originally in 1988 assessed the Baudo oropendola as Threatened, then in 1994 as Endangered, in 2008 as Vulnerable, in 2010 again as Endangered, and since 2019 again as Vulnerable. It has a small range and its estimated population of between 600 and 1700 mature individuals is believed to be decreasing. "The most pertinent threat is the destruction of forests. Particularly along rivers, forests are being cleared for agriculture, oil palm plantations, infrastructural development and commercial or small-scale logging...Additionally, Baudo Oropendola is being trapped for food and for the cagebird trade." A 2010 field guide called it "local and uncommon". It is found in a few protected areas but some subpopulations are unprotected.
