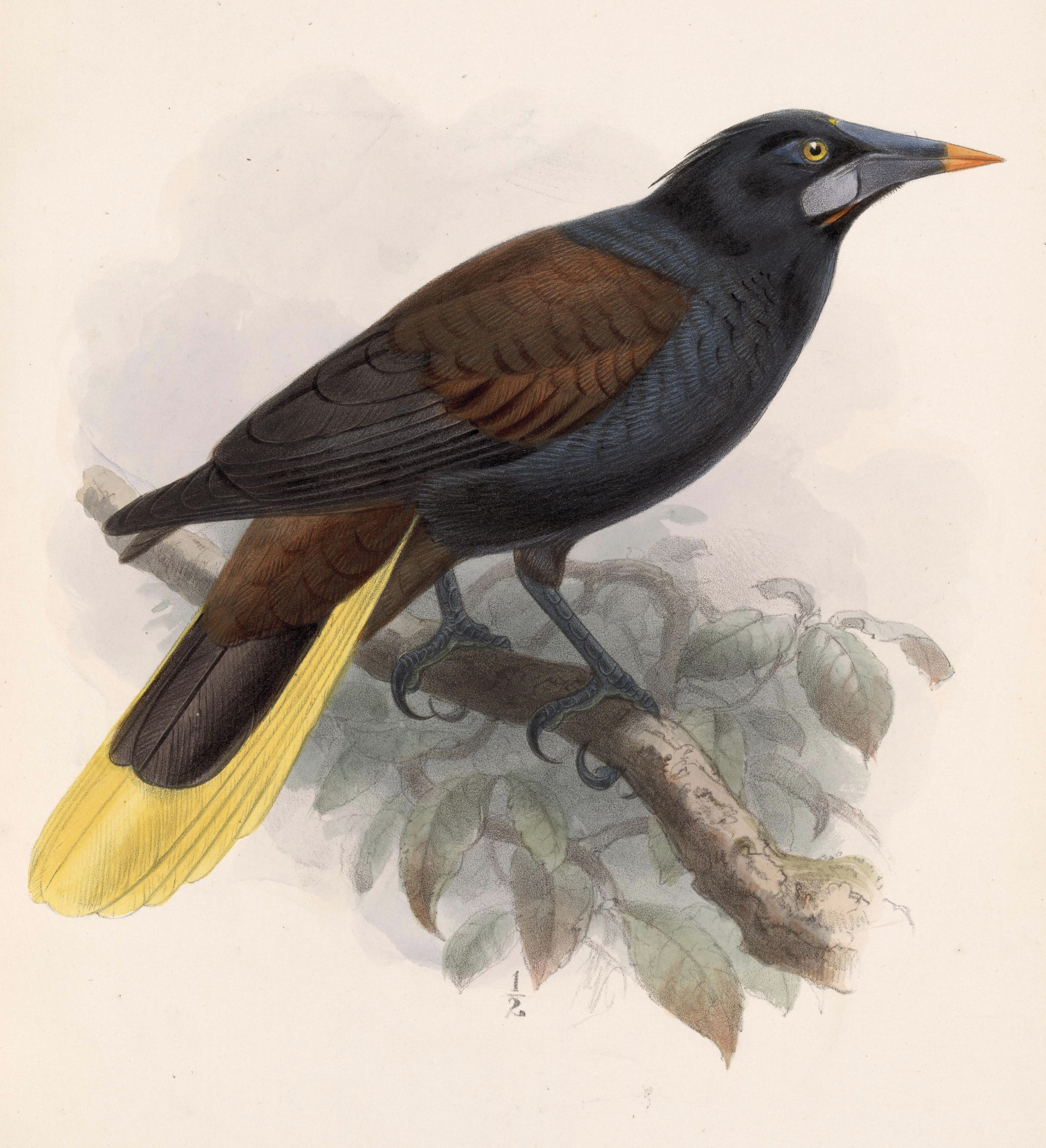

Conservation status
- Least Concern (IUCN 3.1)

Scientific classification
- Kingdom: Animalia
- Phylum: Chordata
- Class: Aves
- Order: Passeriformes
- Family: Icteridae
- Genus: Psarocolius
- Species: P. guatimozinus

Binomial name
- Psarocolius guatimozinus (Bonaparte, 1853)

= Black oropendola =

Species of bird

The black oropendola (Psarocolius guatimozinus) is a species of bird in the family Icteridae, the oropendolas, New World orioles, and New World blackbirds. It is found in Colombia and Panama.

== Taxonomy and systematics ==
The black oropendola was formally described in 1853 with the binomial Ostinops guatimozinus. The specific epithet guatimozinus derives from Guatemozin, who was a nephew of Montezuma and last Aztec emperor. Some early twentieth century authors placed the species in genus Gymnostinops, which was later merged into the current Psarocolius. Some authors have suggested that the black oropendola, the Baudo oropendola (P. cassini), and the olive oropendola (P. bifasciatus) should be merged as a single species.

The black oropendola is monotypic.

== Description ==
Male black oropendolas are about 47 cm (19 in) long and females about 39 cm (15 in). Adult males have long black feathers on their nape that form a crest. Females have a shorter crest but are otherwise like males except for their smaller size. Adults are mostly black. They have a patch of bare pale blue skin on their face and a pink wattle at the base of the bill. Their scapulars, upperwing coverts, lower back, rump, most uppertail coverts, and undertail coverts are dark chestnut. (The rearmost uppertail coverts are black.) Their tail's central pair of feathers are black and the rest yellow; because the black ones are shorter than the others the tail often looks completely yellow from below. They have a large bill with a swollen casque; it is mostly black with an orange tip. They have a brown iris and blackish legs and feet.

== Distribution and habitat ==
The black oropendola is found from eastern Panama's Panamá and Darién provinces into northwestern Colombia's Chocó, Antioquia, and Caldas departments. In Colombia its eastern boundary is the Magdalena River valley. It inhabits the canopy and edges of humid forest and also nearby plantations. In reaches an elevation of 800 m (2,600 ft).

== Behavior ==
=== Movement ===
As best is known, the black oropendola is a year-round resident.

=== Feeding ===
The black oropendola's diet has not been studied but is assumed to include insects, other arthropods, small vertebrates, fruit, and nectar. It usually forages singly or in small groups, and mostly in the forest's higher levels. It has been observed prying apart flowers by opening its bill inside them.

=== Breeding ===
The black oropendola's breeding season includes February in Panama and spans at least April to June in Colombia. It is believed to be polygynous. It nests colonially, with up to 20 nests in a small area. Males display while singing from a perch by deeply bowing. The nest is a bag or purse with an open top woven from plant fibers and lined with leaves. It is typically hung from the tip of a tree branch. The clutch is believed to be two eggs; they are white or pinkish white with darker markings. The incubation period, time to fledging, and details of parental care are not known.

=== Vocalization ===
Male black oropendolas display with a "loud song with low-pitched gurgles and high-pitched metallic notes". Another description is a "running-up bubbling together with unmelodious shrieks". The species' call is a "low cruk".

== Status ==
The IUCN has assessed the black oropendola as being of Least Concern. Its estimated population of at least 20,000 mature individuals is believed to be decreasing. No immediate threats have been identified. One author considers it "uncommon to locally common". Another states it is "rare and local" in Colombia. It is found in Panama's Darién National Park.
