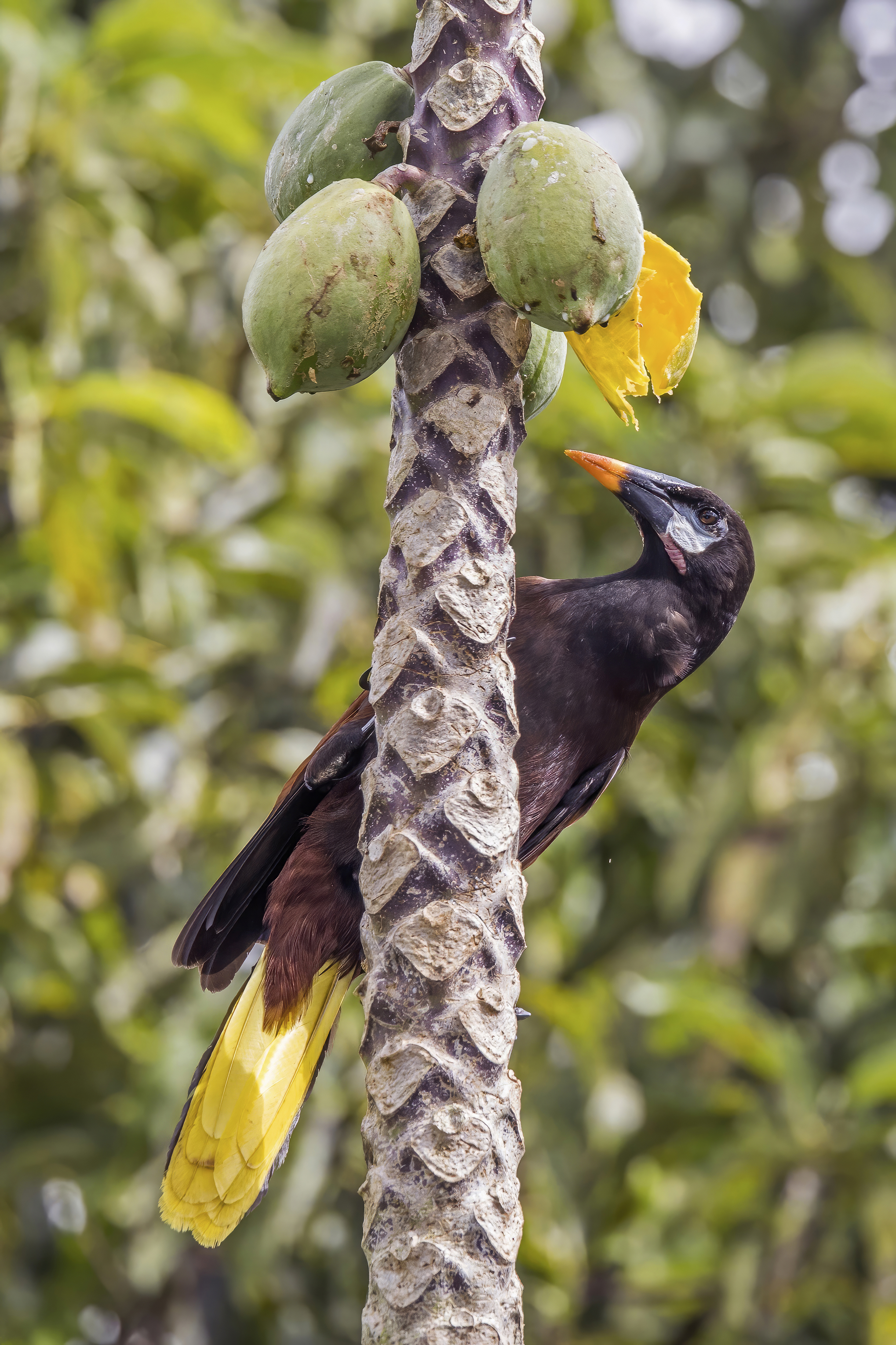
- Feeding on wild papaya in Belize

Conservation status
- Least Concern (IUCN 3.1)

Scientific classification
- Kingdom: Animalia
- Phylum: Chordata
- Class: Aves
- Order: Passeriformes
- Family: Icteridae
- Genus: Psarocolius
- Species: P. montezuma

Binomial name
- Psarocolius montezuma (Lesson, 1830)
- Range of Psarocolius montezuma

Synonyms
- Gymnostinops montezuma

= Montezuma oropendola =

Species of bird

The Montezuma oropendola (Psarocolius montezuma) is a New World tropical icterid bird. It is a resident breeder in the Caribbean coastal lowlands from southeastern Mexico to central Panama, but is absent from El Salvador and southern Guatemala. It also occurs on the Pacific slope of Nicaragua and Honduras and northwestern and southwestern Costa Rica. It is among the oropendola species sometimes separated in the genus Gymnostinops. The English and scientific names of this species commemorate the Aztec emperor Moctezuma II.

== Description ==
Adult males are mainly chestnut with a blackish head and rump, and a tail which is bright yellow apart from two dark central feathers. There is a bare blue cheek patch and a pink wattle, the iris is brown, and the long bill is black at the base with a red tip. Females are similar, but smaller than males with a smaller wattle. Young birds are duller than adults and have a paler and less demarcated bill. No subspecies are currently recognized.

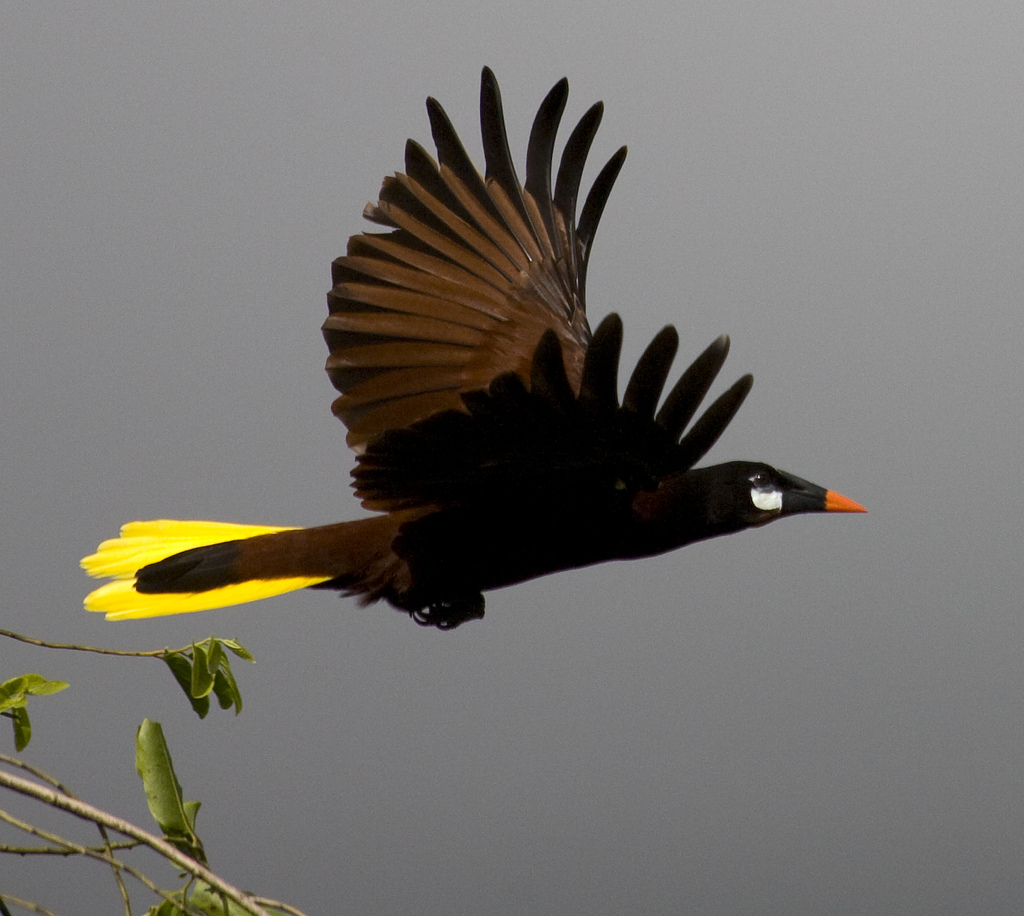
In flight

The sexes are very different in size; the male is 50 cm (20 in) long and weighs 520 g (18 oz); the smaller female is 38 cm (15 in) long and weighs 230 g (8.1 oz). In total body mass, the males are 100% bigger than the females, which is a 2:1 body-to-mass ratio and makes the Montezuma oropendola one of the most sexually-dimorphic birds in the world. Webster et al. says that the size difference in males and females is probably directly related to differences in foraging habits. The females often forage on thin branches, eating insects out of curled up leaves, while the males often perch on thick branches and forage in epiphytes and bromeliads.

Webster et al. also found that sexual dimorphism was more obvious in length of the wing and body mass. Male size and body mass is associated with sexual fitness and dominance. Webster et al. observed that males defend sexually-receptive females, suggesting that Montezuma oropendolas have a female-defence mating system. While the females nest, the males fight and fend off one another, and the males were ranked depending on the outcome of each fight. The alpha male eventually pushes out all other males until he is the only one left. When the alpha males leave the others come back and defend females until he returns. This type of mating system is similar to that of polygynous mammals, not birds.

=== Vocalizations ===
The "unforgettable" song of the male Montezuma oropendola is given during the bowing display, and consists of a conversational bubbling followed by loud gurgles, tic-tic-glik-glak-GLUUuuuuu. Both sexes have loud cack and crrrk calls. In a recent study by on male Montezuma oropendolas, researchers found that, when at breeding sites, males often changed the lowest peak frequency. When males were singing and their song overlapped, the largest male could out-compete the other males at the colony by changing how loud and how deep his lowest peak frequency was.

== Range and habitat ==
The Montezuma oropendola is a quite common bird in parts of its range. They are omnivorous and are often seen in small or larger flocks foraging in trees for small vertebrates, large insects, nectar, and fruit, including bananas, Cecropia spikes, gumbo-limbo (Bursera simaruba) and Trophis racemosa (Moraceae). Outside the breeding season, this species is quite mobile, with some seasonal movements.

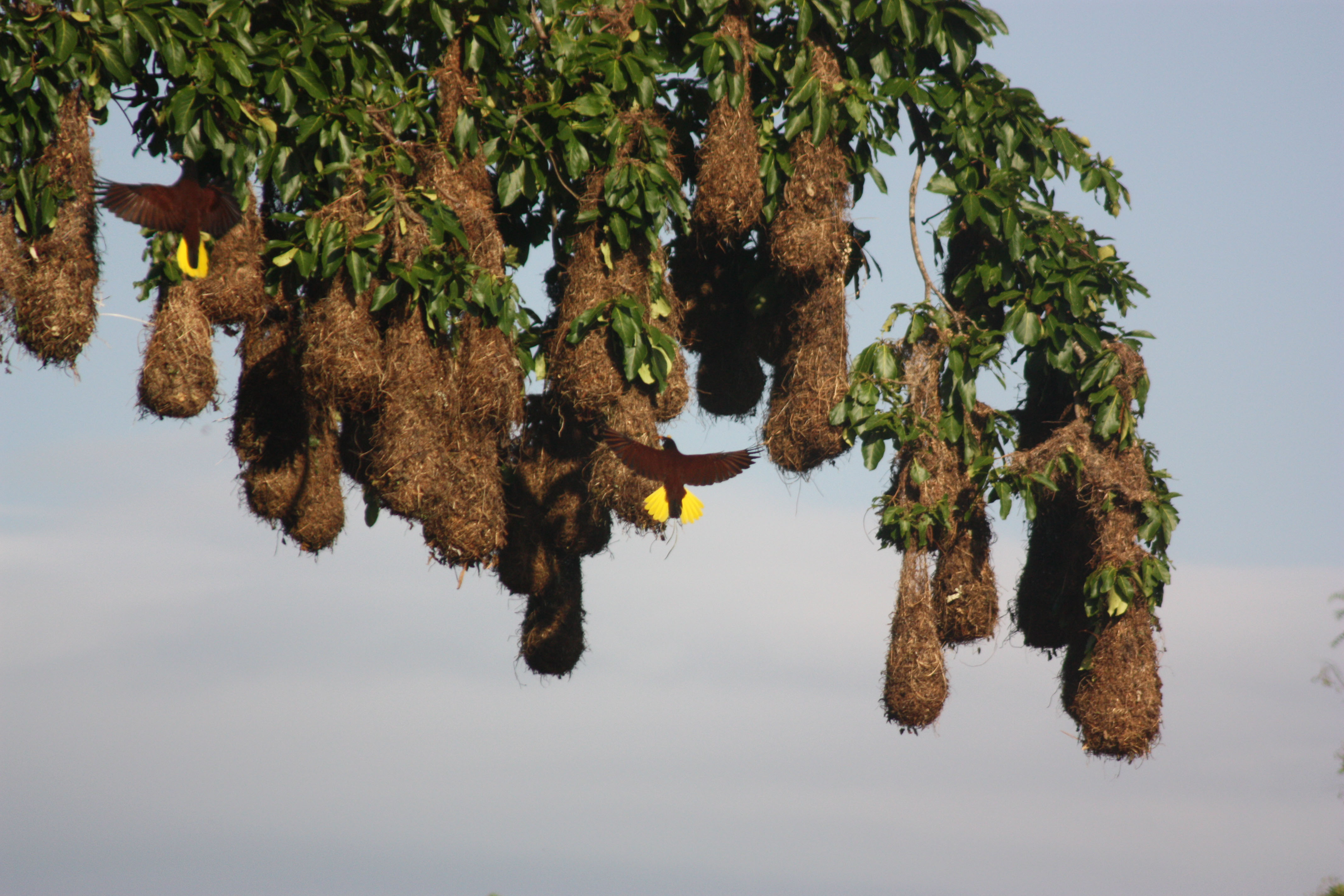
Hanging nests in farmland near Quesada, Costa Rica

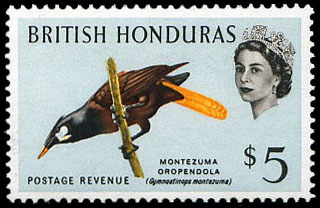
On a British Honduras stamp.

The Montezuma oropendola inhabits forest canopy, edges and old plantations. It is a colonial breeder and only the females build hanging woven nest of fibres and vines, 60–180 cm (24–71 in) long, in a tree that is up to 30 meters high. Each colony has a dominant male, which mates with most of the females following an elaborate bowing display. The female lays two dark-spotted white or buff eggs, and she incubates them without the male until they hatch in 15 days; the young fledge in 30. While the young are still in their nests they are most often fed spiders and other arthropods, frogs, lizards, and fruits. There are typically about 30 nests in a colony, but up to 172 have been recorded.

== Intraspecific relationships ==
Although the chestnut-headed oropendola shares much of this species's range, it is smaller, mainly black with a chestnut head (instead of mainly chestnut with a blackish head), and lacks coloured facial patches, so the two oropendolas are unlikely to be confused.

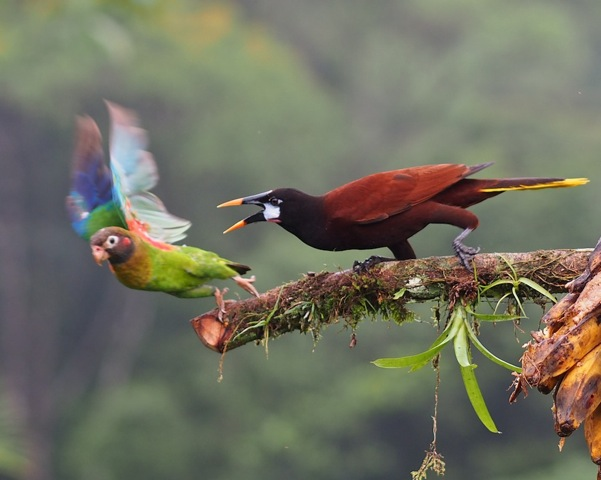
With a brown-hooded parrot

Unlike some populations of its relative, the chestnut-headed oropendola, the Montezuma oropendola does not tolerate brood parasites near their nests. Although Montezuma oropendolas do not have many defenses against Cowbirds, when females see a Giant Cowbird near their own nest they actively defend their nest by attacking the Cowbirds and forcing them to leave their colony. Webster et al. found that the females did not drive the cowbirds away until they were approaching their own nests. This study also found that unlike chestnut-headed oropendolas, the Montezuma oropendolas did not nest near social Hymenoptera. Combined with the fact that Montezuma oropendolas do not allow Cowbirds near their nest, they have no defense against botflies. Nest success is fairly low for the Montezuma Oropendola. The females lay an average of two eggs per nest, but only one is fledged and only one third of the nests in the colonies are successful. Because of their relatively low nest success rate, brood parasites are too high a risk to have around the Montezuma oropendolas nest.
