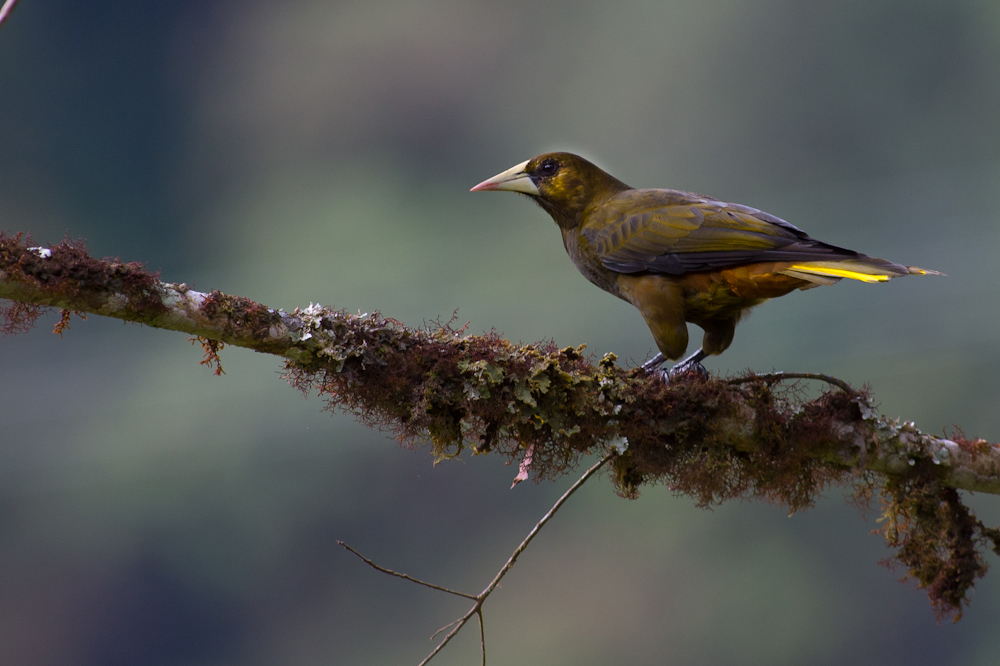

Conservation status
- Least Concern (IUCN 3.1)

Scientific classification
- Kingdom: Animalia
- Phylum: Chordata
- Class: Aves
- Order: Passeriformes
- Family: Icteridae
- Genus: Psarocolius
- Species: P. atrovirens

Binomial name
- Psarocolius atrovirens (Lafresnaye & D'Orbigny, 1838)

= Dusky-green oropendola =

Species of bird

The dusky-green oropendola (Psarocolius atrovirens) is a species of bird in the family Icteridae (New World blackbirds). It is found on the eastern slope of the Andes in Bolivia and Peru. Its natural habitats are subtropical or tropical moist montane forests and heavily degraded former forest.

== Description ==
The male dusky-green oropendola grows to a length of about 42 cm (17 in) and the female of about 33 cm (13 in). The sexes are similar in morphology, the plumage being mainly dark brownish-green or blackish-green, with a rufous-brown rump and crissum (the undertail coverts surrounding the cloaca). The beak is greenish-white, there may be a few yellow feathers on the head, and the iris is brown or blue, the latter colour perhaps appearing in older birds. The russet-backed oropendola (Psarocolius angustifrons), which partly shares the same range, has more rufous upper parts, a yellow forehead and olive-green head which contrasts with its back and wings.

== Distribution and habitat ==
The dusky-green oropendola occurs on the east side of the Andes Mountains, its range extending from Huánuco Province in central Peru to Santa Cruz Department in Bolivia. It occurs in montane forests and near their edges at altitudes of between 800 and 2,600 m (2,600 and 8,500 ft) above sea level, mostly at greater elevations than the russet-backed oropendola.

== Ecology ==
The diet of this bird probably consists of insects (including moths), arthropods, small vertebrates, nectar and fruits. The breeding season is between October and December. The birds breed colonially but colony sizes are small.

== Status ==
The dusky-green oropendola is a common species with a very wide range. The International Union for Conservation of Nature has classified it as being of "least concern" because, although its forest habitat is being gradually reduced, any decline in the numbers of birds is not at a sufficient rate to justify putting the bird in a more threatened category.
