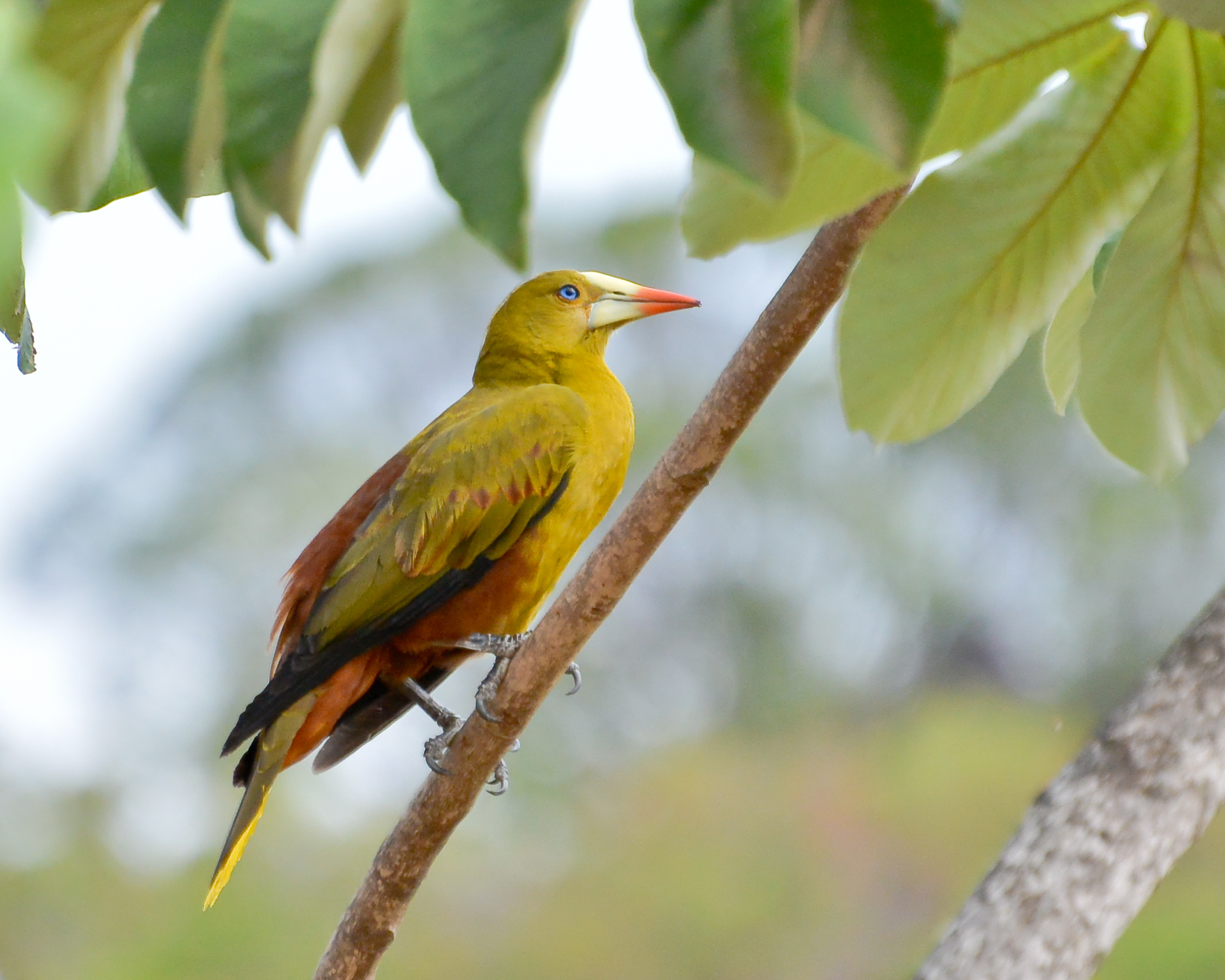
- Green oropendola in Roraima, Brazil

Conservation status
- Least Concern (IUCN 3.1)

Scientific classification
- Kingdom: Animalia
- Phylum: Chordata
- Class: Aves
- Order: Passeriformes
- Family: Icteridae
- Genus: Psarocolius
- Species: P. viridis

Binomial name
- Psarocolius viridis (Müller, 1776)

= Green oropendola =

Species of bird

The green oropendola (Psarocolius viridis) is a species of bird in the family Icteridae, the oropendolas, New World orioles, and New World blackbirds. It is found in Bolivia, Brazil, Colombia, Ecuador, French Guiana, Guyana, Peru, Suriname, and Venezuela.

== Taxonomy and systematics ==
The green oropendola was formally described in 1776 with the binomial Oriolus viridis. Other authors placed it in generus Xanthornus before it was assigned to its present Psarocolius. It is monotypic.

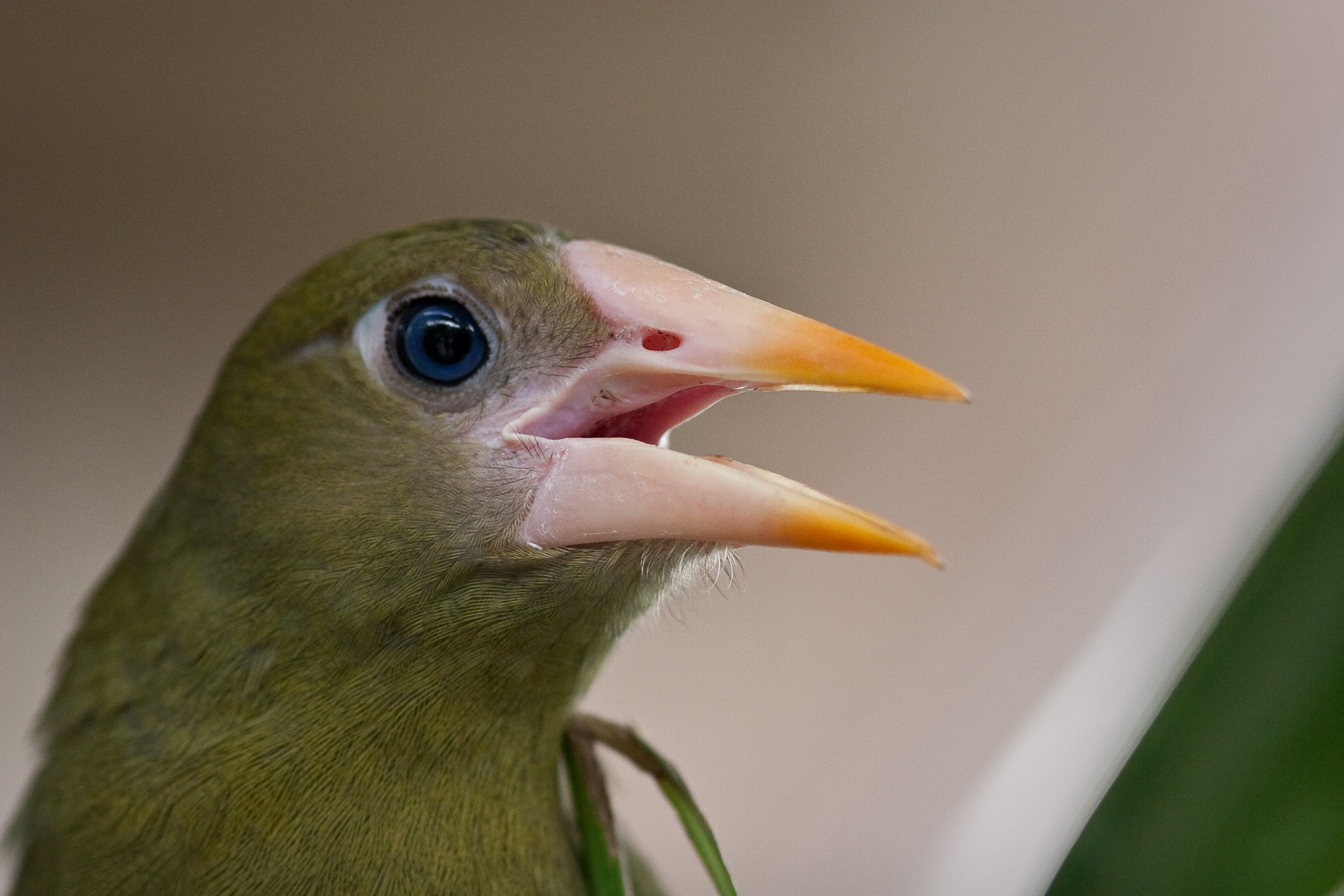
Captive bird at Diergaarde Blijdorp, Netherlands

== Description ==
Male green oropendolas average 48.5 cm (19 in) long and females 37 cm (15 in). Males average 405 g (14 oz) and females 215 g (7.6 oz). Adult males have long feathers on their nape that form a crest. Females lack the crest but are otherwise like males. Adults are mostly yellowish olive. They are pink to dull orange on the lores and around their eye. Their wings are dusky olive and their rump, uppertail coverts, belly, thighs, and crissum are chestnut. Their central pair of tail feathers are dusky olive and the rest yellow with dusky olive outer edges on the outermost pair. Both sexes have a large bill with a swollen casque; the bill's inner half is pea-green and its outer half orange-red. They have a pale blue iris and blackish legs and feet. Juveniles are similar to adults but duller; their eyes are dark brown, they have less extensive chestnut, and their underparts have a grayish wash.

== Distribution and habitat ==
The green oropendola is a bird of the Amazon Basin. It is found in approximately the southeastern third of Colombia and into the western part of southern Venezuela's Amazonas state. It also occurs from eastern Venezuela's Monagas, Delta Amacuro, and Bolívar states east through the Guianas. From Colombia its range continues south through eastern Ecuador and northern Peru's Amazonas and Loreto departments into extreme northern Bolivia. There is also a small disjunct population in central Peru's Pasco Department. From Colombia, Ecuador, and Peru its range continues east through most of Amazonian Brazil. There its southern border is a line approximately Acre-central Rondônia-southwestern Pará-northern Maranhão.

The green oropendola mostly inhabits humid primary forest including várzea, terra firme, gallery, and lower montane forest types. It is rare in forest that has been disturbed. In elevation it reaches 1,100 m (3,600 ft) in Venezuela, 500 m (1,600 ft) in Colombia, 600 m (2,000 ft) in Ecuador, and 500 m (1,600 ft) in Brazil.

== Behavior ==
=== Movement ===
As best is known, the green oropendola is a sedentary year-round resident.

=== Feeding ===
The green oropendola appears to feed mostly on insects and other arthropods. It also feeds on fruit and nectar but details are lacking. It forages in flocks and usually in the forest canopy. At least in French Guiana it is an important seed disperser. The species has been observed following a small group of red-throated caracaras (Ibycter americanus) through the canopy. The caracaras are specialist predators of wasp nests, and the oropendolas followed the group for several hours, feeding independently and not necessarily at the same level in the canopy nor on the same items of diet.

=== Breeding ===
The green oropendola's breeding season has not been defined in most of its range. Its season spans February to April in Venezuela and Suriname and July to December in Amazonas, Brazil. It breeds in colonies that seldom exceed 10 nests spread among several trees. Males display while singing from a perch by tipping ("bowing") and shaking their wings. The nest is a bag or purse with an open top woven by the female from plant fibers. It is hung from a tree branch tip typically between about 20 and 25 m (65 and 80 ft) above the ground. The clutch is two eggs that are greenish white with darker markings. The female alone incubates; males apparently contribute only by defending the colony. The incubation period, time to fledging, and other details of parental care are not known. The giant cowbird (Molothrus oryzivorus) is a brood parasite.

=== Vocalization ===
The male green oropendola's song is "variable and complex". They "commonly start with a descending whistle (barely audible at distance) and/or rattling sounds". A lyrical description calls it "a rapid, squealing, and liquid Qu-Q-Q-q-q-q-qD'D'D'CLOCK, agoogoo, 1st part like a giant spring stretching, then dull sticks knocking, last par a mellow hooting". The same author describes the species' calls as "chut-ut, scratchy queea, and other notes". Another author describes the song as a "fast, rising, gobbling rrrrrrrrrúh, ending in a gurgling ronc-ronc-ronc-ronc" and its calls as "varied, e.g. tjak tjaktjak notes".

== Status ==
The IUCN has assessed the green oropendola as being of Least Concern. It has a very large range; its population size is not known but is believed to be stable. No immediate threats have been identified. It is not considered numerous in Venezuela; it is "local and uncommon" in Colombia, "somewhat local" in Ecuador, "rare to locally fairly common" in Amazonian Peru and rare in the isolated population, and "frequent to uncommon" in Brazil. It is found in several protected areas but seems to be "the most forest-adapted of the oropendolas, being sensitive to deforestation".
