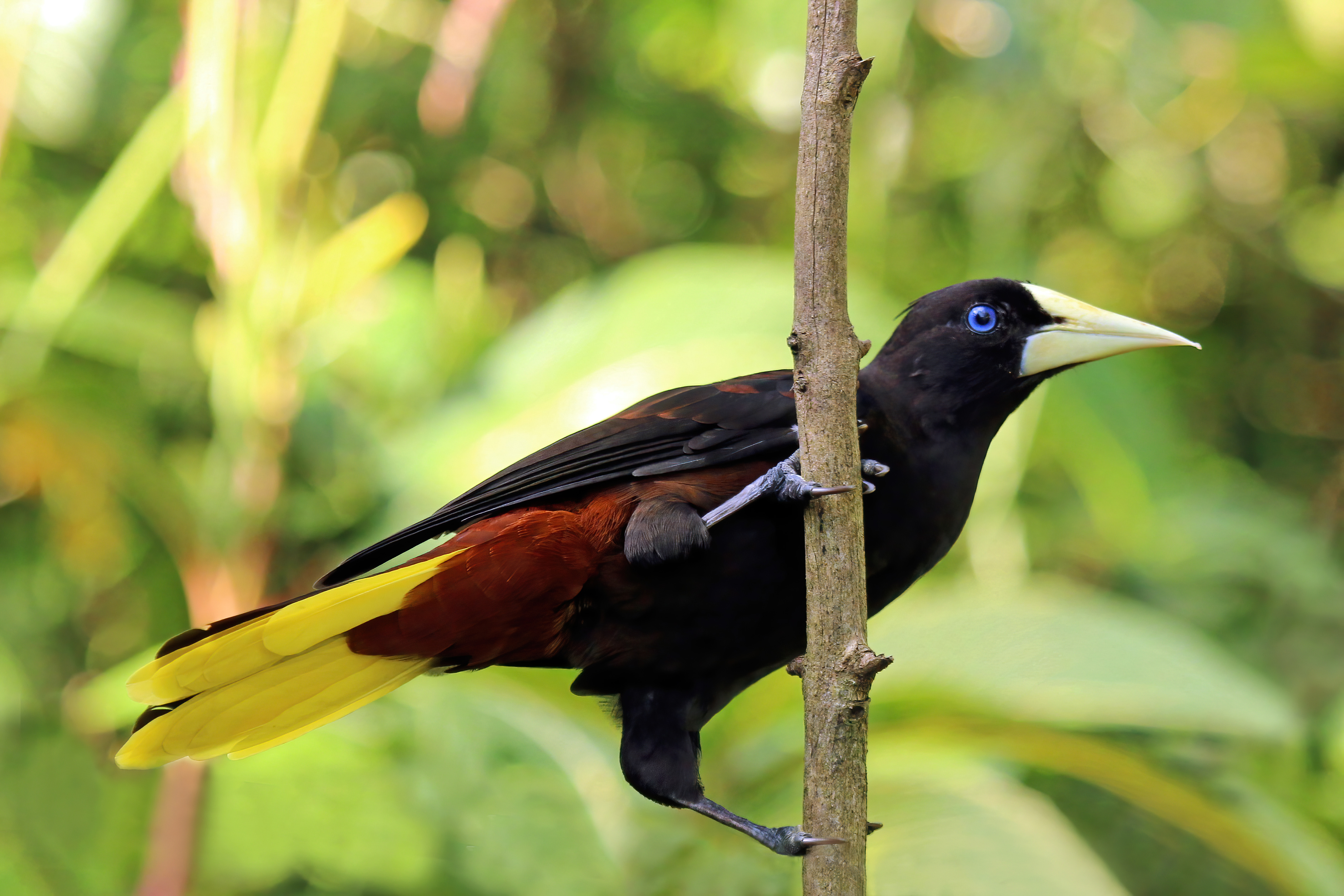
- P. d. insularis, Trinidad

Conservation status
- Least Concern (IUCN 3.1)

Scientific classification
- Kingdom: Animalia
- Phylum: Chordata
- Class: Aves
- Order: Passeriformes
- Family: Icteridae
- Genus: Psarocolius
- Species: P. decumanus

Binomial name
- Psarocolius decumanus (Pallas, 1769)

= Crested oropendola =

Species of bird

The crested oropendola (Psarocolius decumanus), also known as the cornbird, is a species of bird in the family Icteridae, the oropendolas, New World orioles, and New World blackbirds. It is found in Costa Rica, Panama, Trinidad and Tobago, and every mainland South American country except Chile and Uruguay. It is "[u]ndoubtedly overall the commonest and most widespread oropendola".

== Taxonomy and systematics ==
The crested oropendola was formally described in 1769 with the binomial Xanthornis decumanus. Some authors placed it in genus Ostinops before it was assigned to its present Psarocolius.

The crested oropendola's further taxonomy is unsettled. The IOC, the Clements taxonomy, and AviList assign it these four subspecies:

- P. d. melanterus (Todd, 1917)
- P. d. insularis (Dalmas, 1900)
- P. d. decumanus (Pallas, 1769)
- P. d. maculosus (Chapman, 1920)

However, BirdLife International's Handbook of the Birds of the World (HBW) does not recognize P. d. maculosus but includes it within P. d. decumanus. The Cornell Lab of Ornithology's Birds of the World states that DNA data do not support P. d. maculosus as a defined subspecies but does include its description and range in its species account.

This article follows the four-subspecies model.

== Description ==
Male crested oropendolas of the nominate subspecies P. d. decumanus average 47 cm (19 in) long and females 37 cm (15 in). Males weigh about 285 g (10 oz) and females about 160 g (5.6 oz). Adult males have long feathers on their nape that form a crest. They are mostly a slightly glossy black with a chesnut rump, uppertail coverts, and undertail coverts. Their central pair of tail feathers are black and the rest yellow. Adult females are overall duller than males; they are brownish tinged rather than pure black and have a minimal crest. Both sexes have a large ivory to pale yellow bill with a swollen casque, a blue iris, and black legs and feet. Juveniles are similar to adult females but even duller; their eyes are dark brownish and their bill has a brown tinge. Subspecies P. d. melanterus is a glossier black and has less chestnut than the nominate. P. d. insularis is smaller than the nominate and has chestnut flanks and belly. P. d. maculosus is very like the nominate but often has pale yellow feathers scattered throughout its body. Some individuals of the nominate also show this trait.

== Distribution and habitat ==
The subspecies of the crested oropendola are found thus:

- P. d. melanterus: from extreme southern Costa Rica south through Panama into northern and central Colombia west of the country's Eastern Andes
- P. d. insularis: Trinidad and Tobago
- P. d. decumanus: from Colombia east of the Andes across Venezuela (but see below) and the Guianas; south through eastern Ecuador into Peru to the Amazon River, and most of Brazil except the far east
- P. d. maculosus: Peru south of the Amazon, northern and eastern Bolivia, most of Paraguay, northwestern Argentina's Jujuy and Salta provinces, and northeastern Argentina's Formosa and Corrientes provinces

The range of P. d. decumanus in Venezuela is uncertain. There it is well known north of the Orinoco River and near the Guianas, is a straggler to the llanos, and is probably present but not known in the central part of the country.

The exact division of ranges between P. d. decumanus and P. d. maculosus is vague except in Peru.

The crested oropendola inhabits a variety of landscapes but is not regularly found in extensive primary forest. It favors the edges and clearings of primary forest in the tropical, subtropical, and lower montane zones, gallery forest especially in the Pantanal, savanna, and coffee and cacao plantations with large trees. In its tiny Costa Rican range it occurs between 100 and 1,500 m (300 and 4,900 ft). In Panama it reaches 1,000 m (3,300 ft). In Venezuela it reaches 1,900 m (6,200 ft) north of the Orinoco and 500 m (1,600 ft) south of it. It reaches 2,600 m (8,500 ft) in Colombia, 1,000 m (3,300 ft) in Ecuador, and 1,200 m (3,900 ft) in Peru and Brazil.

== Behavior ==
=== Movement ===
As best is known, the crested oropendola is a sedentary year-round resident.

=== Feeding ===
The crested oropendola feeds primarily on wild and cultivated fruits, insects, and spiders. Small vertebrates such as tree-frogs and the nectar of flowers are smaller components of its diet. It feeds mostly in flocks of its own species in the upper levels of the forest but sometimes joins mixed-species feeding flocks that include other icterids and jays (Corvidae). It is persecuted as an agricultural pest in Trinidad, Venezuela, and some other areas.

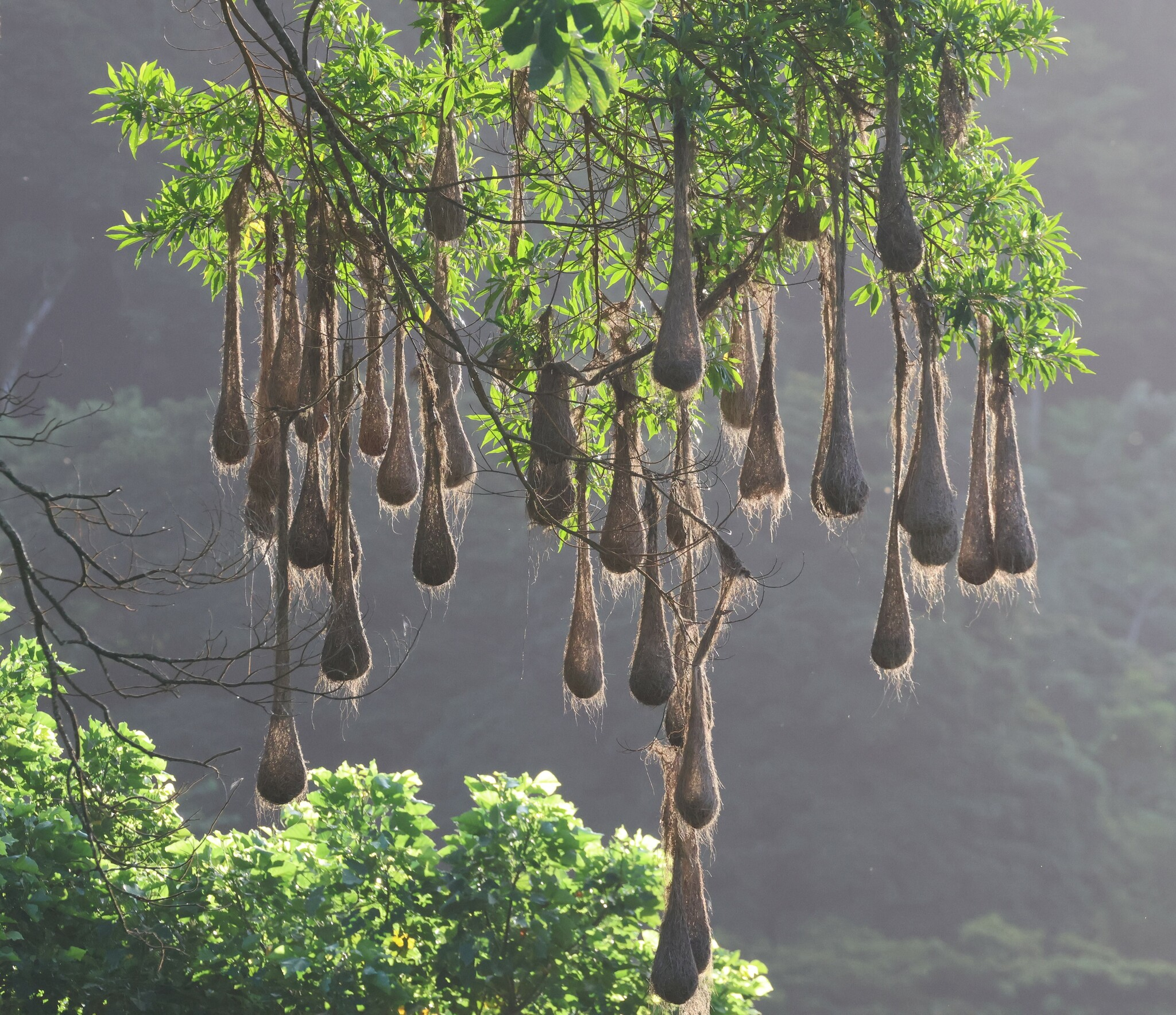
Nests in Trinidad

=== Breeding ===
The crested oropendola's breeding season has not been defined in most of its range. Its season spans January to June in Venezuela and October to December in northwestern Argentina. It breeds in colonies. In Trinidad these may have more than 40 nests but on the mainland seldom have more than 10. Males sing while displaying on a perch by tipping forward ("bowing"), raising their tail, and flapping their wings. The nest is a bag or purse with an open top woven by the female from plant fibers and lined with leaves. It is hung from a tree branch tip; usually the tree is isolated and in gallery forest is often over the water. The usual clutch is two eggs that are bluish white, pale gray, or buff with blackish markings. Females incubate for 17 to 19 days and fledging occurs 28 to 34 days after hatch. Females provision nestlings; males contribute to parental care only by defending the colony. The giant cowbird (Molothrus oryzivorus) is a frequent brood parasite over most of the species' range.

=== Vocalization ===
The male crested oropendola's display song "usually starts with low-pitched liquid notes, accelerates into variable and complex rattling crescendo, and ends with 2–3 seconds of rhythmic wing-flaps". One description calls it "very complex, including very high, rapid, staccato flutes and liquid curls". Another description is "a variable, descending, rattling gurgle, usually ending in a quavering liquid hooting phrase...for example: glug'te'e'e'e'e'e'er'OP wuubuubuub".

=== Other ===
The crested oropendola is a host of the Acanthocephalan intestinal parasite Apororhynchus aculeatus.

The crested oropendola often roosts on river islands, usually only with others of its species but sometimes with other oropendolas.

== Status ==
The IUCN has assessed the crested oropendola as being of Least Concern. It has an extremely large range; its estimated population of at least five million mature individuals is believed to be decreasing. No immediate threats have been identified. It reached Costa Rica in 1999 and is expanding its range there but remains uncommon. It is "uncommon to fairly common" in Venezuela, "common and conspicuous" in Colombia, "widespread" in Ecuador, and "fairly common" in Peru. In much of Brazil it is "common to frequent" but is "frequent to uncommon" in the southeastern quarter of its range there. It is the "most widespread and ecologically tolerant oropendola; [and is] apparently able to tolerate partial deforestation more than are its congeners." It occurs in many protected areas.

== Gallery ==
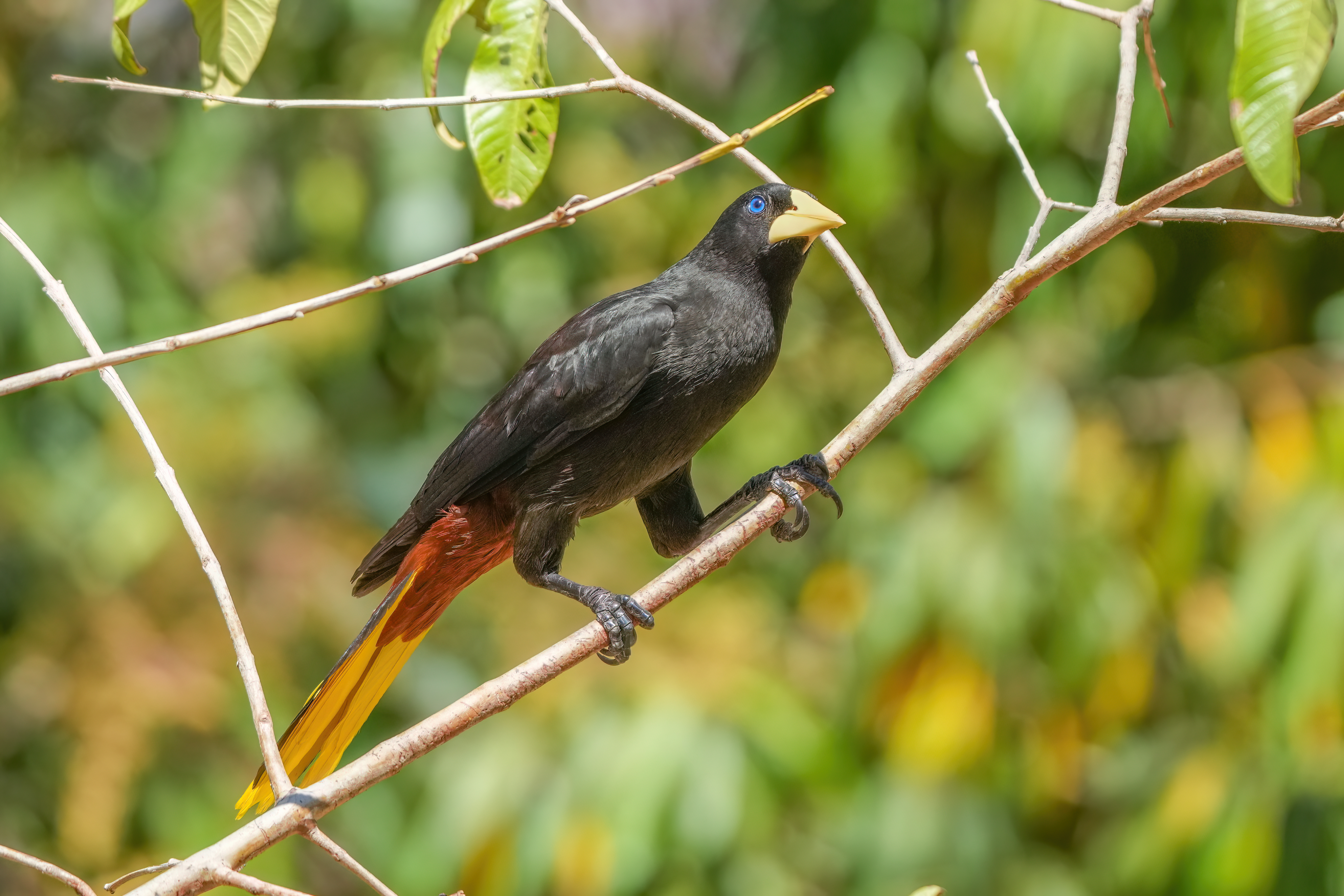
P. d. maculosus, Brazil

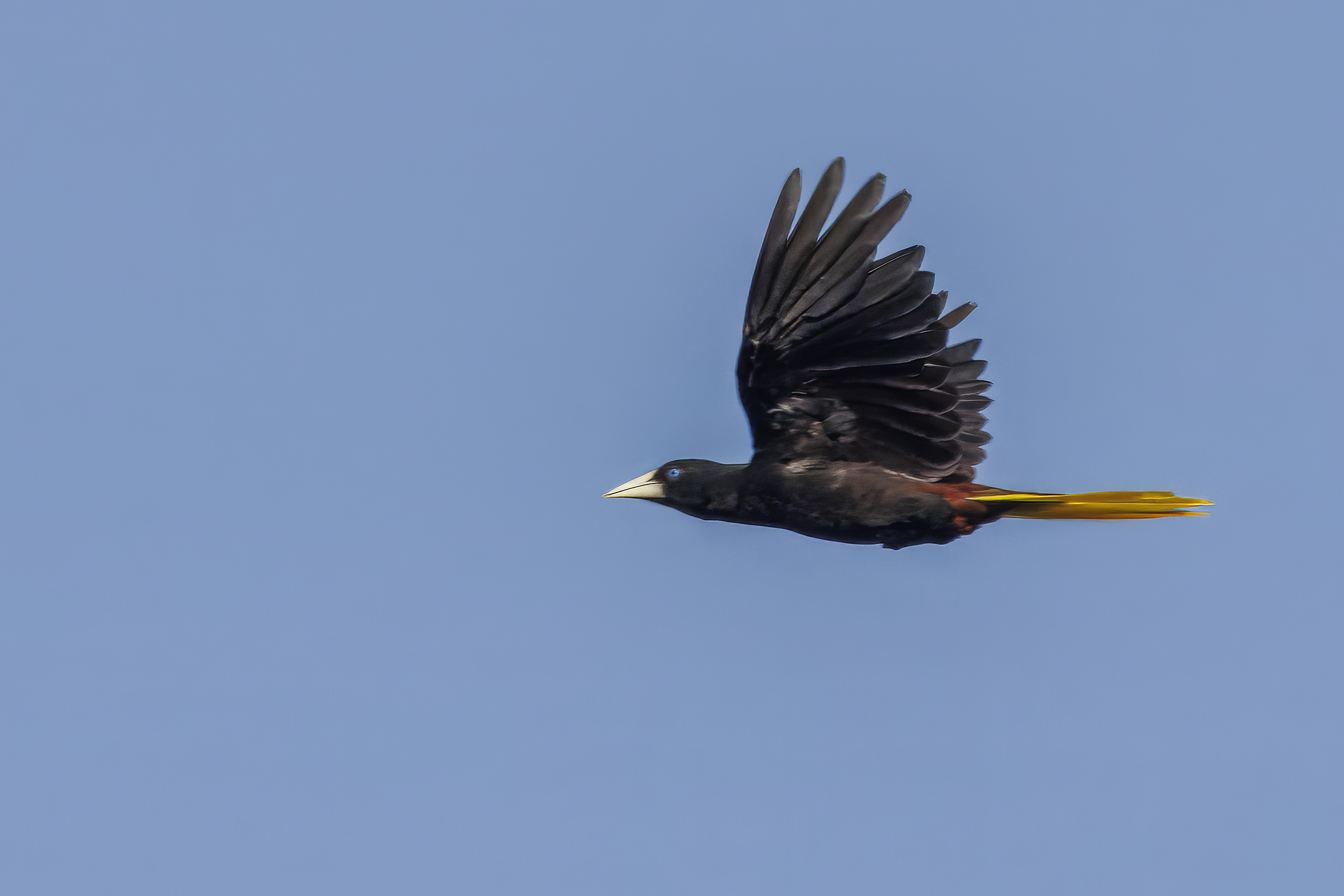
P. d. decumanus, Ecuador

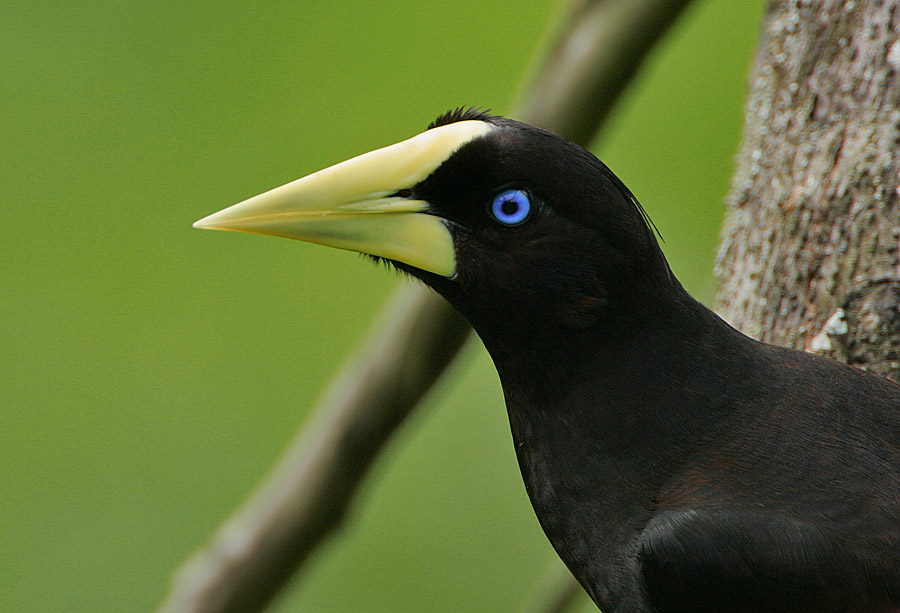
P. d. insularis, Trinidad
