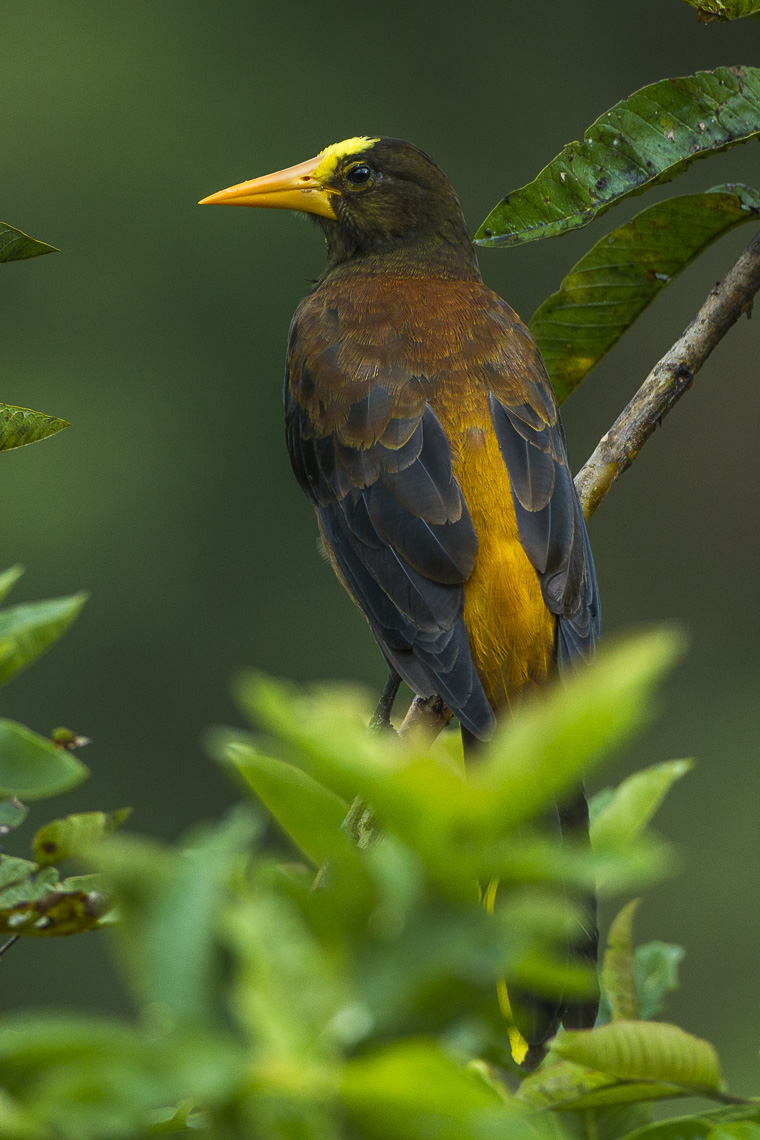
- In Colombia Song of russet-backed oropendola

Conservation status
- Least Concern (IUCN 3.1)

- Least Concern (IUCN 3.1)

Scientific classification
- Kingdom: Animalia
- Phylum: Chordata
- Class: Aves
- Order: Passeriformes
- Family: Icteridae
- Genus: Psarocolius
- Species: P. angustifrons

Binomial name
- Psarocolius angustifrons (Spix, 1824)
- Range of russet-backed oropendola

= Russet-backed oropendola =

Species of bird

The russet-backed oropendola (Psarocolius angustifrons) is a species of bird in the family Icteridae, the oropendolas, New World orioles, and New World blackbirds. It is found in Bolivia, Brazil, Colombia, Ecuador, Peru, and Venezuela. It is a "noisy and social bird that forages, nests, and roosts in groups".

== Taxonomy and systematics ==
The russet-backed oropendola was formally described in 1824 with the binomial Cassicus angustifrons. Authors placed it variously in genera Xanthornus or Ostinops before it was assigned to its present Psarocolius.

The russet-backed oropendola's further taxonomy is unsettled. The IOC, the Clements taxonomy, AviList, and the independent South American Classification Committee assign it these seven subspecies:

- P. a. salmoni (Sclater, PL, 1883)
- P. a. atrocastaneus (Cabanis, 1873)
- P. a. sincipitalis (Cabanis, 1873)
- P. a. neglectus (Chapman, 1914)
- P. a. oleagineus (Sclater, PL, 1883)
- P. a. angustifrons (Spix, 1824)
- P. a. alfredi (Des Murs, 1856)

However, in 2016 BirdLife International's Handbook of the Birds of the World (HBW) split P. oleagineus as the species "green-billed oropendola" and as of late 2025 retains it separately. Clements makes a distinction within the species, calling oleagineous the "russet-backed oropendola (green-billed)" and grouping the other six subspecies as the "russet-backed oropendola (russet-backed)". Some authors have suggested that P. a. angustifrons and P. a. oleagineus each be accorded separate species status and the other five subspecies be a third species called the "yellow-billed oropendola". Others have suggested that P. a. neglectus could be a separate species.

"Phenotypic and vocal variation within P. angustifrons is complex and multiple species may be present; however, an integrative study of variation in voice, plumage, and genetics is needed before any changes are made."

This article follows the seven-subspecies model.

== Description ==
Russet-backed oropendola males are 44 to 48 cm (17 to 19 in) long and females 34 to 38 cm (13 to 15 in). Males weigh about 250 to 470 g (8.8 to 17 oz) and females about 170 to 230 g (6.0 to 8.1 oz). Adult males have long feathers on their nape that form a crest and females do not; their plumage is otherwise the same. Adult males of the nominate subspecies P. a. angustifrons have an olivaceous-brown head and a mostly brown body and wings with a russet tinge. Their rump and uppertail coverts are paler russet-brown. Their central pair of tail feathers are dusky brown and the rest yellow with dusky brown edges and tips on the outermost pair. They have a dark brown iris, a blackish bill, and blackish legs and feet. Juveniles have a somewhat yellower head than adults and are duller yellow on the tail.

The other subspecies of the russet-backed oropendola differ from the nominate and each other thus:

- P. a. salmoni: yellow forehead, chestnut back, russet rump, blackish brown wings and tail, and ivory-colored bill
- P. a. atrocastaneus: yellow forehead, rufescent body and wings, orange-yellow bill, and sometimes a blue iris
- P. a. sincipitalis: like salmoni but overall paler
- P. a. neglectus: darker than nominate with a yellow supercilium and an orange-yellow bill
- P. a. oleagineus: mostly yellowish olive with tawny-brown tinge on the back, rufous-brown rump and uppertail coverts, mostly yellow tail with dusky olive central feathers and olive outermost pair, mostly yellowish olive flight feathers, and greenish ivory bill
- P. a. alfredi: yellowish olive head with yellow forehead, brownish chestnut body, russet rump and uppertail coverts, brownish olive central tail feathers, other tail feathers yellow with brownish olive tips, pale greenish yellow bill, and (in Ecuador and Peru) blue eyes

== Distribution and habitat ==
The russet-backed oropendola has a disjunct distribution. The subspecies are found thus:

- P. a. salmoni: Colombia's Western and Central Andes
- P. a. atrocastaneus: western Andean slope of Ecuador south to El Oro Province
- P. a. sincipitalis: western slope of Colombia's Eastern Andes from Santander Department south to northern Huila Department
- P. a. neglectus: Serranía del Perijá on the Colombia-Venezuela border; from southern Lara state in northwestern Venezuela south along the Venezuelan Andes and the eastern slope of Colombia's Eastern Andes to Caquetá Department
- P. a. oleagineus: northern Venezuelan Yaracuy state and the Venezuelan Coastal Range between Carabobo and Miranda states
- P. a. angustifrons: lower eastern Andean foothills and Amazon Basin from Colombia's Meta and Vaupés departments south through eastern Ecuador to Ucayali Department in Peru; from that span east in Brazil south of the Amazon to the lower Purus River
- P. a. alfredi: eastern Andean slopes and upper foothills from Morona-Santiago Province in southeastern Ecuador south through Peru into central Bolivia to western Santa Cruz Department

The subspecies of the russet-backed oropendola inhabit different landscapes. The nominate subspecies of the Amazon Basin is primarily in várzea forest along whitewater rivers and also is found around oxbow lakes and in clearings in more upland forest. Subspecies P. a. alfredi inhabits várzea and also humid primary and secondary forest and plantations in the foothills. P. a. oleagineus inhabits humid to wet montane forest and nearby more open woodlands and shade coffee plantations. The other subspecies inhabit wet subtropical montane forest and nearby plantations. In Venezuela the species ranges in elevation between 400 and 2,000 m (1,300 and 6,600 ft) in the Coastal Range and between 1,200 and 2,500 m (3,900 and 8,200 ft) in the Andes. It is found below 2,500 m (8,200 ft) in Colombia, below 2,000 m (6,600 ft) in eastern Ecuador, between 1,000 and 2,000 m (3,300 and 6,600 ft) in western Ecuador, below 2,000 m (6,600 ft) in Peru, and below 800 m (2,600 ft) in Brazil. In Bolivia it mostly occurs below 1,700 m (5,600 ft).

== Behavior ==
=== Movement ===
The Amazonian and other lowland populations of the russet-backed oropendola are believed to be sedentary year-round residents. Some elevational movements have been noted in Andean populations.

=== Feeding ===
The russet-backed oropendola is "almost omnivorous". It feeds on arthropods, small vertebrates such as frogs, wild and cultivated fruits, and nectar. It forages in flocks that may include other oropendolas, jays (Corvidae), and tanagers (Thraupidae), though subspecies P. a. oleagineus usually forages in single-species flocks. It often seeks prey in epiphytic bromeliads and in clusters of leaves and other debris caught in trees.

=== Breeding ===
The breeding seasons of the russet-backed oropendola vary among the subspecies. The nominate breeds between September and March, P. a. alfredi between June and September, and P. a. oleagineus between February and August. The species is polygynous and breeds in colonies, with one or two males dominating and perhaps some others subordinate. Colonies of the nominate may number up to about 30 nests spread among three to five trees, though most subspecies' colonies are smaller. The nest is a bag or purse with an open top woven by the female from plant fibers. It is hung from a branch of a wild or cultivated tree up to about 15 m (50 ft) above the ground. The usual clutch is one or two eggs though three are known; they are salmon-colored with darker markings. Females incubate for 18 to 20 days and fledging occurs about 30 days after hatch. Females provision nestlings; males contribute to parental care only by defending the colony. The giant cowbird (Molothrus oryzivorus) is a brood parasite in P. a. alfredi colonies; other subspecies are not known to be hosts.

=== Other ===
The russet-backed oropendola roosts communally, with P. a. angustifrons gathering "in truly huge aggregations on certain river islands".

=== Vocalizaton ===
Male russet-backed oropendolas sing while displaying on a perch by tipping forward ("bowing"), raising their tail, and flapping their wings. Their song varies somewhat among the subspecies but in general "usually starts with low-pitched notes and increases in pitch and volume in a final crescendo". Subspecies P. a. oleagineus sings a "Whoop-ko-kéek". P. a. neglectus sings a "loud, liquid ou-oou-ouu'PLOP! [or] u-pu-pU-POIK!" and its calls are "a loud Schweep! and softer, rising wink or chwink". In eastern Ecuador the species sings "a loud and accelerating , slashing g-g-guh-guh-gágok!" and in the west "a loud g-kyoooyk!". In Peru its song is described as "a liquid trill, variable, for example gluglu-TZZZ'CHUI" and its calls "a hollow C'LAK, cak, and mewing eww".

== Status ==
The IUCN follows HBW taxonomy and so has separately assessed the "russet-backed" and "green-billed" oropendolas. Both are assessed as being of Least Concern. The "russet-backed" P. angustifrons sensu stricto has a very large range; its population size is not known and is believed to be decreasing. The "green-billed" P. oleagineus has a limited range; its population size is also unknown but is believed to be stable. No immediate threats to either have been identified. It is considered "uncommon to locally common" in the Venezuelan Coastal Range and local in the Venezuela Andes. It is "common and conspicuous" in Colombia, common in Ecuador and "the most common and conspicuous oropendola" in the eastern lowlands of the country, "fairly common" in Peru, and "common to frequent" in Brazil.

== Gallery ==
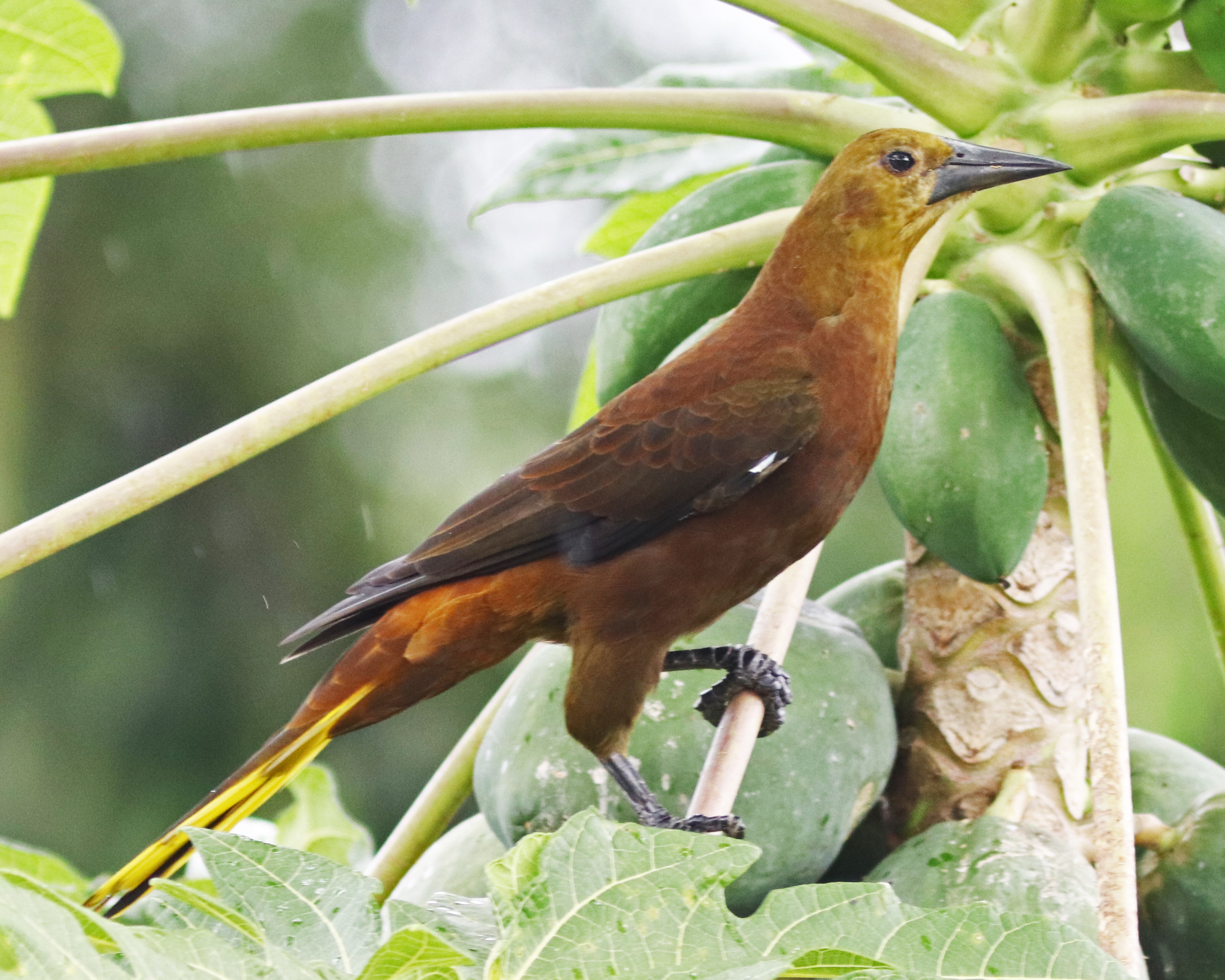
P. a. angustifrons in the lowlands of eastern Ecuador

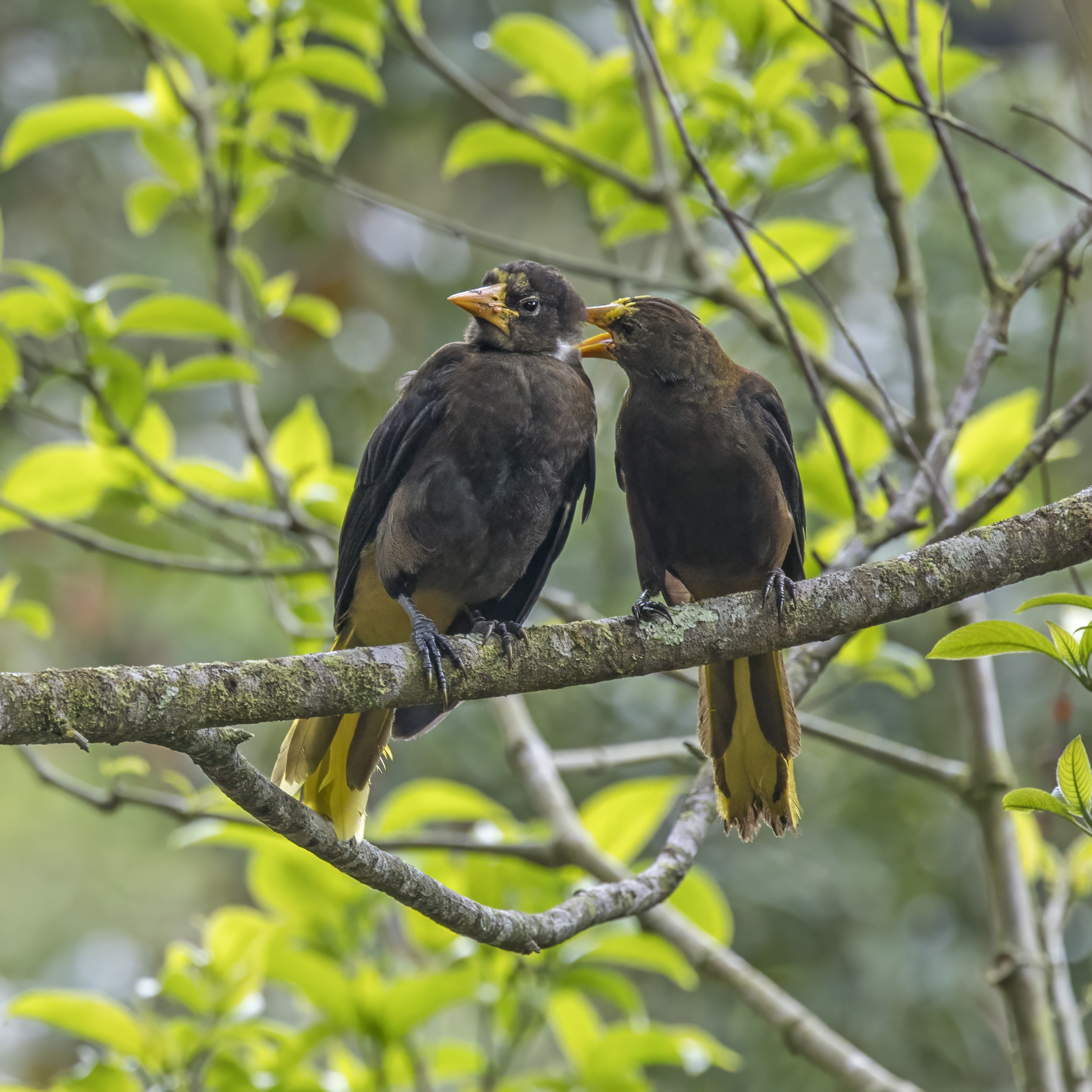
Pair of P. a. salmoni grooming, Colombia
