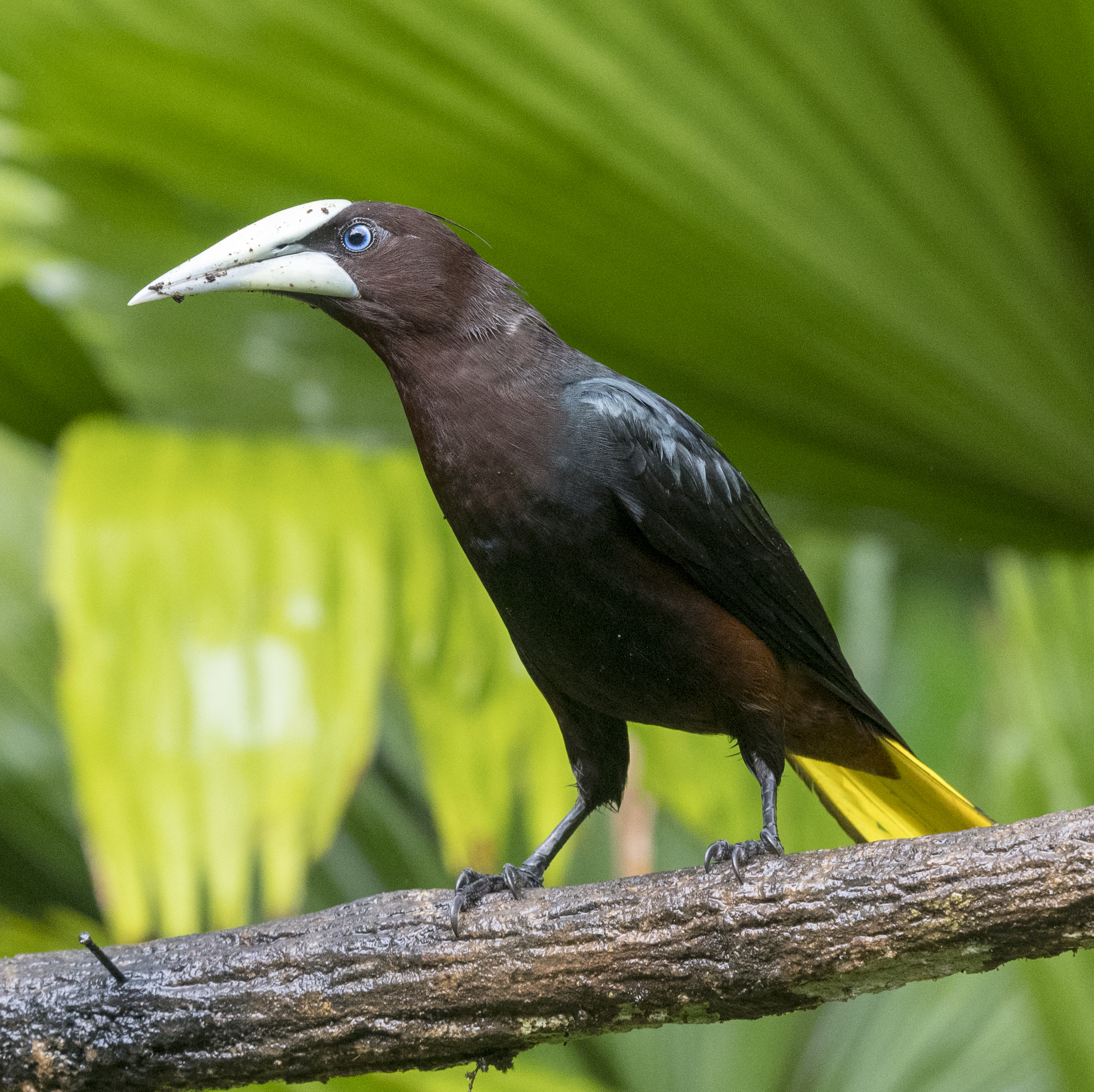
- In Turrialba, Costa Rica

Conservation status
- Least Concern (IUCN 3.1)

Scientific classification
- Kingdom: Animalia
- Phylum: Chordata
- Class: Aves
- Order: Passeriformes
- Family: Icteridae
- Genus: Psarocolius
- Species: P. wagleri

Binomial name
- Psarocolius wagleri (Gray, GR, 1844)
- Range of P. wagleri

Synonyms
- see text

= Chestnut-headed oropendola =

Species of bird

The chestnut-headed oropendola (Psarocolius wagleri) is a species of bird in the family Icteridae, the oropendolas, New World orioles, and New World blackbirds. It is found in Mexico, in every Central American country except El Salvador, and in Colombia and Ecuador.

== Taxonomy and systematics ==
The chestnut-headed oropendola was formally described in 1844 with an illustration and the binomial Cacicus Wagleri [sic]. Its specific epithet commemorates Johann Georg Wagler, who had erected genus Psarocolius in 1827. It eventually was reassigned to Psarocolius but for a time was placed in its own genus Zarhynchus.

The chestnut-headed oropendola has two subspecies, the nominate P. w. wagleri (Gray, GR, 1844) and P. w. ridgwayi (Van Rossem, 1934).

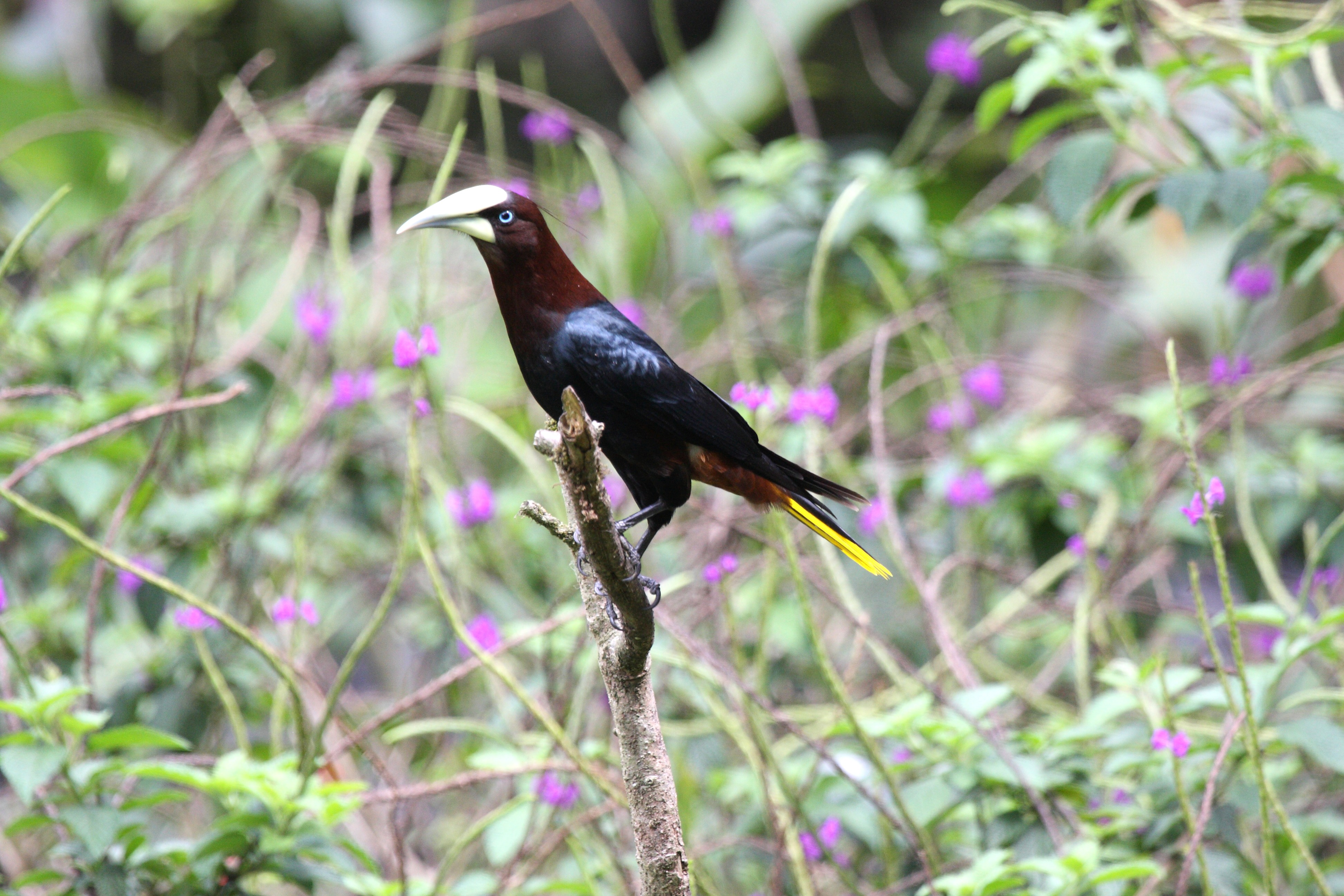
P. w. ridgwayi in Panama

== Description ==
Chestnut-headed oropendola males average 35 cm (14 in) long and females 28 cm (11 in). Males weigh an average of 214 g (7.5 oz) and females 113 g (4.0 oz). The species looks very long-winged in flight. Males have a slight crest. Adult males of the nominate subspecies have a dark purplish chestnut head, throat, and upper breast. Their body and wings are mostly black with a bluish gloss. Their rump and uppertail coverts are dark chestnut and their rear flanks and undertail coverts a medium chestnut. Their central pair of tail feathers are black and the rest yellow with black edges on the outermost pair. Females are much like males but have duller colors. Subspecies P. w. ridgwayi is much like the nominate but has paler chestnut parts. Both sexes of both subspecies have very large bill with a swollen casque; it is ivory-colored with a pale bluish to gray tip and tomium and sometimes an overall pale greenish tinge. They have a pale blue iris and black legs and feet. Juveniles are duller than adults and have brownish eyes, a brownish bill, and some yellow feathers on the forehead.

== Distribution and habitat ==
The nominate subspecies of the chestnut-headed oropendola is the more northerly of the two. It is found on the Gulf/Caribbean slope from Veracruz and northern Oaxaca in southeastern Mexico south through Belize, eastern Guatemala, and eastern Honduras into northeastern Nicaragua. However, it is not on the Yucatán Peninsula. Subspecies P. w. ridgwayi is found throughout southern Nicaragua, along the Caribbean and lower Pacific slopes of Costa Rica, throughout Panama, and into northern Colombia. There its range extends east to the Serranía de las Quinchas and Serranía de San Lucas and south along the Pacific slope into northwestern Ecuador to northern Manabí Province. There are also scattered records in Ecuador south to El Oro Province.

The chestnut-headed oropendola inhabits evergreen forest and secondary forest in the tropical and lower subtropical zones. It also occurs in plantations and suburban areas and in northern Central America sometimes at the edges of pine-oak forest. In Mexico and Central America it ranges in elevation from sea level to about 1,700 m (5,600 ft). In Colombia it reaches 1,300 m (4,300 ft) and in Ecuador 700 m (2,300 ft).

== Behavior ==
=== Movement ===
The chestnut-headed oropendola is in general a resident species, but it is known to make elevational and seasonal movements over short distances. Though the reasons for the movements are not fully understood, the availability of fruiting trees is one probable motive.

=== Feeding ===
The chestnut-headed oropendola feeds primarily on small vertebrates such as frogs and lizards. Insects, other arthropods, fruit, and nectar are also significant components of its diet. It usually forages from the forest's mid-story to its canopy, and typically in flocks of up to 15 individuals.

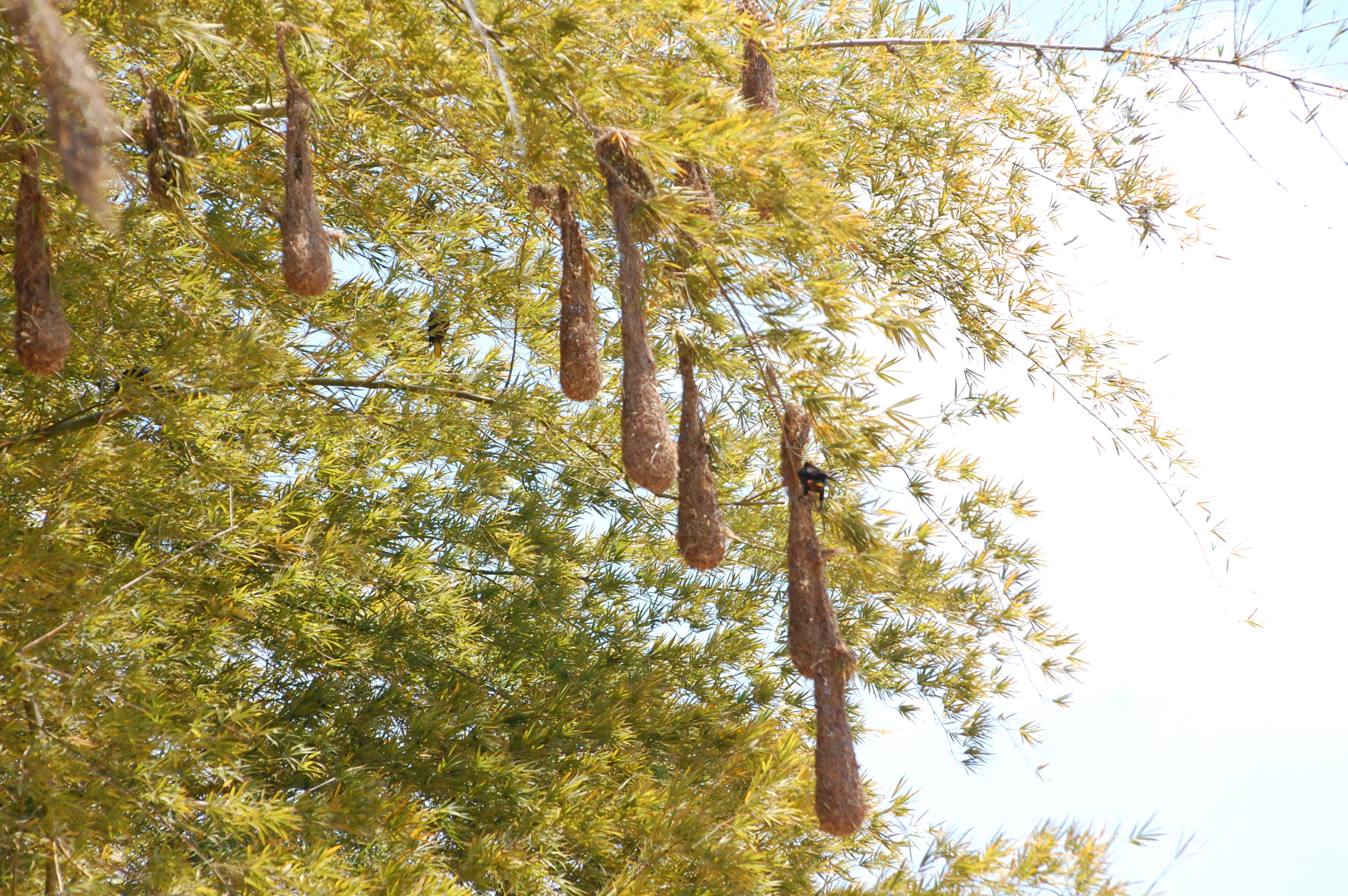
Nests near El Valle de Antón, Panama

=== Breeding ===
The chestnut-headed oropendola breeds between January and June. The species is polygynous and nests in colonies that often have as many as 60 nests in a tree or group of them. Up to 130 nests have been observed. Females weave a bag or purse from a variety of plant fibers including palm leaves and vines and line it with leaves both dry and green. It is suspended from the tip of a branch of a tree or palm. The clutch is two eggs that are pale blue with brownish black markings. The female incubates for about 17 days and fledging may take up to 35 days after hatch. Males defend the colony against predators. The giant cowbird (Molothrus oryzivorus) is a frequent brood parasite.

=== Vocal and non-vocal sounds ===
The chestnut-headed oropendola's song is short and variable and is "low pop sounds followed by harsh, crashing noises (likened to sound made by a machete cutting vegetation)". A common call in Costa Rica and Panama is "a liquid, low-pitched waku-waku". Another description of the song is "a loud gurgling...preceded by several harsh slashing notes", which the male gives while ruffling feathers and rising up from a perch. Another description of the common call is "a scratchy, liquid, electric whaaakka". Other calls include "a deep chok or kok". Males' wings are noisy in flight.

== Status ==
The IUCN has assessed the chestnut-headed oropendola as being of Least Concern. It has a very large range; its estimated population of at least 500,000 mature individuals is believed to be decreasing. No immediate threats have been identified. It is considered fairly common on the Caribbean slope of northern Central America but rare to uncommon in the interior highlands. It is "fairly uncommon" on the Caribbean side of Costa Rica and rare on the Pacific side. It is fairly common in Colombia. It occurs in at least one protected area in each of Costa Rica, Panama, and Colombia.
