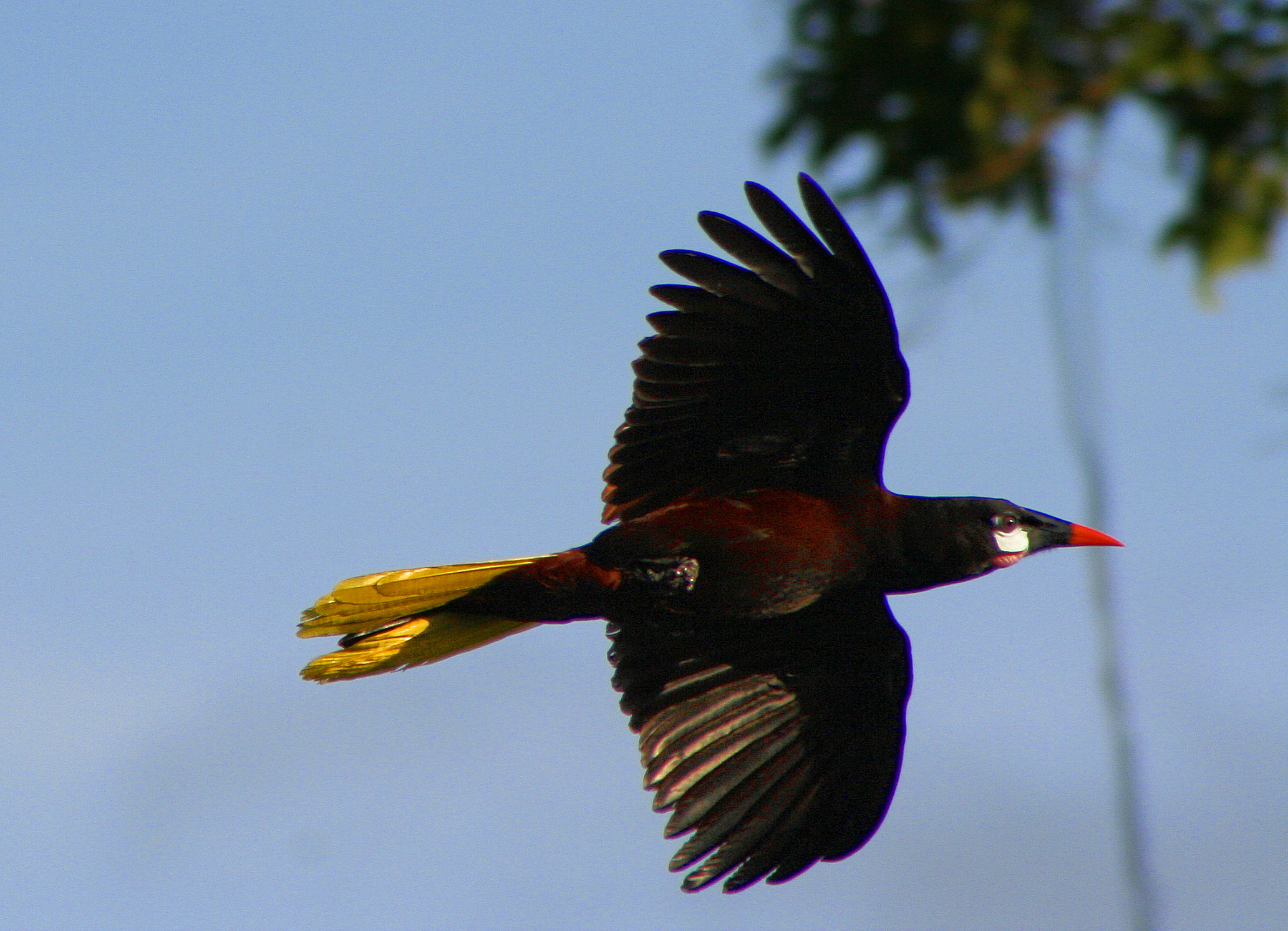
- Montezuma oropendola (Psarocolius montezuma)

Scientific classification
- Kingdom: Animalia
- Phylum: Chordata
- Class: Aves
- Order: Passeriformes
- Family: Icteridae
- Genus: Psarocolius; Wagler, 1827

Type species
- Oriolus cristatus Gmelin, 1788=Xanthornus decumanus Pallas, 1769

Species
- See text

Synonyms
- Gymnostinops Sclater, 1886 (but see text)

= Oropendola =

Genus of birds

Oropendolas are a genus of passerine birds, Psarocolius, in the New World blackbird family Icteridae which are native to Central and South America.

They were once divided into two or three separate genera, but this is no longer the case. All oropendolas are large birds with pointed bills and long tails that are at least partly bright yellow. Males are typically larger than females. The plumage is typically chestnut, dark brown or black, although the green oropendola and olive oropendola have, as their names imply, an olive coloration to the head, breast and upper back. The legs are dark, but the bill is usually a strikingly contrasting feature, either pale yellow, or red-tipped with a green or black base. In several species there is also a blue or pink bare cheek patch.

Oropendolas are birds associated with forests or, for a few species, more open woodland. These social birds feed on large insects and fruit. They are highly vocal and produce a wide variety of songs and calls, sometimes including mimicry. They are colonial breeders, with several long woven basket nests in a tree, each hanging from the end of a branch.

== Taxonomy ==
The genus Psarocolius was introduced in 1837 by the German naturalist Johann Georg Wagler. The genus name combines the Ancient Greek ψάρ/psár (genitive ψαρός/psarós), meaning "starling", and κολοιός/koloiós, meaning "jackdaw". Wagler did not specify a type species but in 1855 the English zoologist George Gray designated the type as Oriolus cristatus Gmelin, 1788. This a junior synonym of Xanthornus decumanus Pallas, 1769, the crested oropendola.

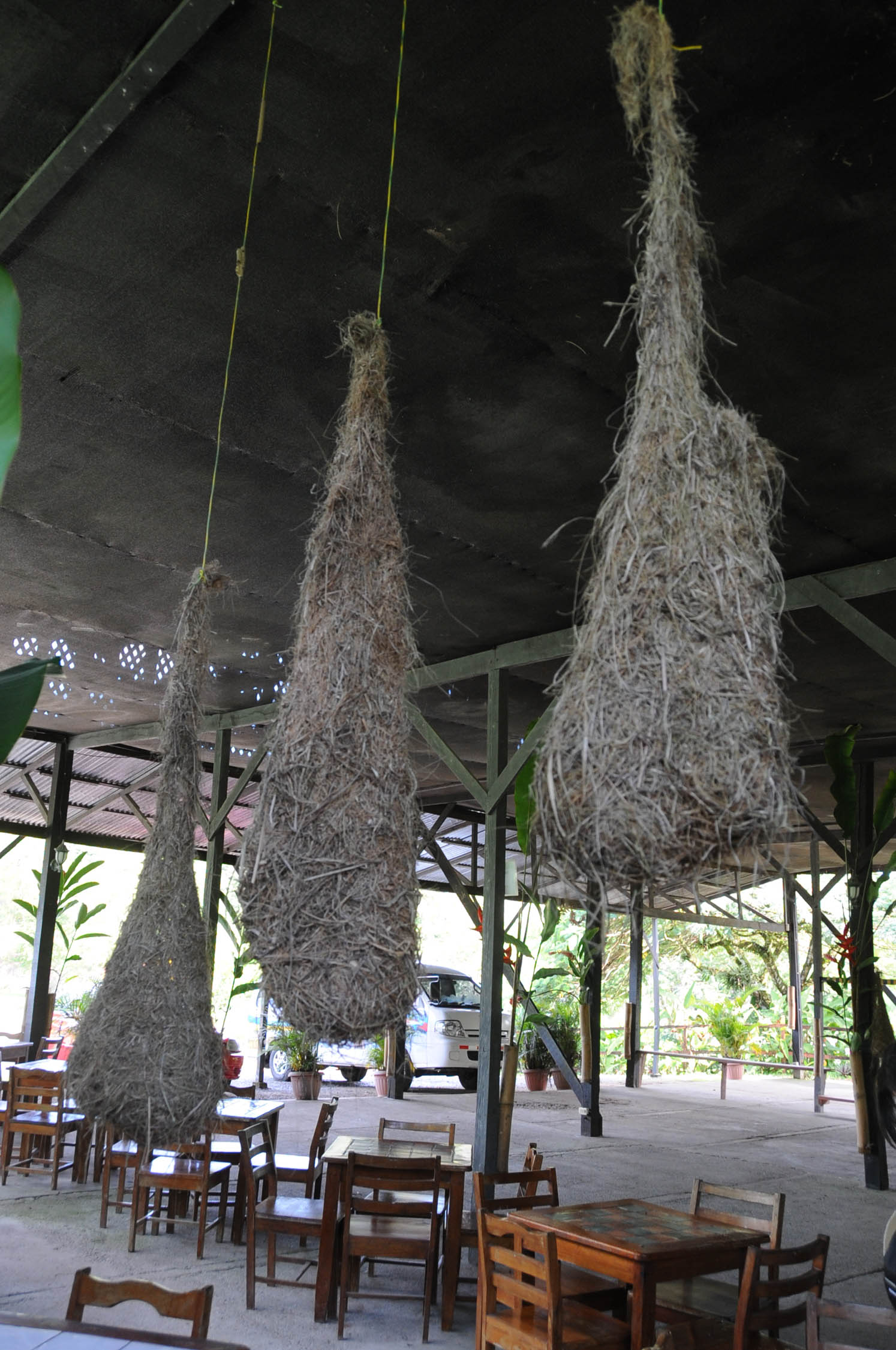
Oropendola nests in Limon, Costa Rica

The genus contains the following nine species:

Genus Psarocolius – Wagler, 1827 – nine species
Common name	Scientific name and subspecies	Range	Size and ecology	IUCN status and estimated population
Russet-backed oropendola	Psarocolius angustifrons (Spix, 1824) Seven subspecies: P. a. salmoni (Sclater, PL, 1883); P. a. atrocastaneus (Cabanis, 1873); P. a. sincipitalis (Cabanis, 1873); P. a. neglectus (Chapman, 1914); P. a. oleagineus (Sclater, PL, 1883); P. a. angustifrons (Spix, 1824); P. a. alfredi (Des Murs, 1856)	Disjunct distribution in Colombia (Western, Central and Eastern Andes), Ecuador, Peru, Bolivia, Brazil and Venezuela (Andes and Coastal Range): lower eastern Andean foothills and the Amazon Basin, the western Andean slope of Ecuador south to El Oro Province, and the eastern Andean slopes south into central Bolivia	Size: Males 44–48 cm (17–19 in), 250–470 g (8.8–17 oz); females 34–38 cm (13–15 in), 170–230 g (6.0–8.1 oz) Habitat: Varies by subspecies: várzea forest along whitewater rivers, oxbow lakes and clearings in upland forest (nominate); humid to wet montane forest, nearby open woodland and shade coffee plantations (oleagineus); wet subtropical montane forest and nearby plantations (others); below 2,500 m (8,200 ft) in Colombia, below 2,000 m (6,600 ft) in eastern Ecuador and Peru, below 800 m (2,600 ft) in Brazil Diet: "Almost omnivorous": arthropods, small vertebrates such as frogs, wild and cultivated fruits and nectar; forages in flocks that may include other oropendolas, jays and tanagers; often seeks prey in epiphytic bromeliads and clusters of leaves and debris caught in trees	LC Decreasing; population size not known
Dusky-green oropendola	Psarocolius atrovirens (Lafresnaye & D'Orbigny, 1838)	Eastern slope of the Andes, from Huánuco Province in central Peru to Santa Cruz Department in Bolivia	Size: Males about 42 cm (17 in); females about 33 cm (13 in) Habitat: Montane forests and near their edges, and heavily degraded former forest, at 800–2,600 m (2,600–8,500 ft), mostly at greater elevations than the russet-backed oropendola Diet: Probably insects (including moths), other arthropods, small vertebrates, nectar and fruits	LC Common, with a very wide range
Green oropendola	Psarocolius viridis (Müller, 1776)	Amazon Basin: southeastern Colombia, western Amazonas state in southern Venezuela, eastern Venezuela and the Guianas, eastern Ecuador, northern Peru (Amazonas and Loreto departments), extreme northern Bolivia and most of Amazonian Brazil; a small disjunct population in Pasco Department, central Peru	Size: Males average 48.5 cm (19 in), 405 g (14 oz); females average 37 cm (15 in), 215 g (7.6 oz) Habitat: Mostly humid primary forest, including várzea, terra firme, gallery and lower montane forest; rare in disturbed forest; reaches 1,100 m (3,600 ft) in Venezuela, 500 m (1,600 ft) in Colombia, 600 m (2,000 ft) in Ecuador and 500 m (1,600 ft) in Brazil Diet: Mostly insects and other arthropods, also fruit and nectar; forages in flocks, usually in the forest canopy; an important seed disperser in French Guiana	LC Stable; population size not known
Crested oropendola	Psarocolius decumanus (Pallas, 1769) Four subspecies: P. d. melanterus (Todd, 1917); P. d. insularis (Dalmas, 1900); P. d. decumanus (Pallas, 1769); P. d. maculosus (Chapman, 1920)	Costa Rica, Panama, Trinidad and Tobago, and every mainland South American country except Chile and Uruguay	Size: Males average 47 cm (19 in), about 285 g (10 oz); females average 37 cm (15 in), about 160 g (5.6 oz) (nominate subspecies) Habitat: Edges and clearings of primary forest in the tropical, subtropical and lower montane zones, gallery forest (especially in the Pantanal), savanna, and coffee and cacao plantations with large trees; not regularly found in extensive primary forest; reaches 2,600 m (8,500 ft) in Colombia Diet: Primarily wild and cultivated fruits, insects and spiders; also small vertebrates such as tree-frogs and nectar; feeds mostly in flocks of its own species in the upper levels of the forest, sometimes joining mixed-species flocks; persecuted as an agricultural pest in Trinidad, Venezuela and some other areas	LC Decreasing; at least 5 million mature individuals
Chestnut-headed oropendola	Psarocolius wagleri (Gray, GR, 1844) Two subspecies: P. w. wagleri (Gray, GR, 1844); P. w. ridgwayi (Van Rossem, 1934)	Mexico, every Central American country except El Salvador, and Colombia and Ecuador: Gulf/Caribbean slope from Veracruz and northern Oaxaca south to northeastern Nicaragua (not the Yucatán Peninsula), southern Nicaragua, Costa Rica and Panama, and the Pacific slope of Colombia and Ecuador to northern Manabí Province	Size: Males average 35 cm (14 in), 214 g (7.5 oz); females average 28 cm (11 in), 113 g (4.0 oz) Habitat: Evergreen forest and secondary forest in the tropical and lower subtropical zones, also plantations, suburban areas and sometimes edges of pine-oak forest; sea level to about 1,700 m (5,600 ft) in Mexico and Central America, 1,300 m (4,300 ft) in Colombia, 700 m (2,300 ft) in Ecuador Diet: Primarily small vertebrates such as frogs and lizards; insects, other arthropods, fruit and nectar also significant; usually forages from the mid-story to the canopy, typically in flocks of up to 15	LC Decreasing; at least 500,000 mature individuals
Montezuma oropendola	Psarocolius montezuma (Lesson, 1830)	Caribbean coastal lowlands from southeastern Mexico to central Panama, absent from El Salvador and southern Guatemala; also the Pacific slope of Nicaragua and Honduras and northwestern and southwestern Costa Rica	Size: Males 50 cm (20 in), 520 g (18 oz); females 38 cm (15 in), 230 g (8.1 oz) Habitat: Forest canopy, edges and old plantations; nests in colonies in trees up to 30 m (100 ft) high Diet: Omnivorous: small vertebrates, large insects, nectar and fruit (including bananas, Cecropia spikes and gumbo-limbo); males often forage on thick branches and in epiphytes and bromeliads, females on thin branches, eating insects from curled-up leaves; often in small or larger flocks	LC
Black oropendola	Psarocolius guatimozinus (Bonaparte, 1853)	Eastern Panama (Panamá and Darién provinces) into northwestern Colombia (Chocó, Antioquia and Caldas departments), east to the Magdalena River valley	Size: Males about 47 cm (19 in); females about 39 cm (15 in) Habitat: Canopy and edges of humid forest and nearby plantations, up to 800 m (2,600 ft) Diet: Diet not studied but assumed to include insects, other arthropods, small vertebrates, fruit and nectar; usually forages singly or in small groups, mostly in the forest's higher levels; has been seen prying apart flowers with its bill	LC Decreasing; at least 20,000 mature individuals
Baudo oropendola	Psarocolius cassini (Richmond, 1898)	Endemic to northwestern Colombia: mainly the Serranía del Baudó and Serranía del Saltos in Chocó Department and slightly into far northwestern Antioquia Department, with a very small isolated population on the border of Chocó and Risaralda departments; overall range about 31,300 km² (12,100 sq mi)	Size: Males about 46 cm (18 in); females about 39.5 cm (16 in) Habitat: Humid lowland and foothill forest, favouring primary forest with some openings and tall emergent trees but also in secondary forest; below about 400 m (1,300 ft) Diet: Diet not studied but known to include insects and fruit; apparently feeds mostly in the forest canopy in flocks of up to about 10–12; has been seen foraging with chestnut-headed oropendolas	VU Decreasing; 600–1,700 mature individuals
Olive oropendola	Psarocolius bifasciatus (Spix, 1824) Three subspecies: P. b. yuracares (d'Orbigny & Lafresnaye, 1838); P. b. neivae (Snethlage, E, 1925); P. b. bifasciatus (Spix, 1824)	Amazon and upper Orinoco river basins: southeastern Colombia, western Amazonas and Bolívar states in southern Venezuela, eastern Ecuador, eastern Peru, central Bolivia and Amazonian Brazil	Size: Males 47–53 cm (19–21 in); females 34–38 cm (13–15 in) Habitat: Primarily mature humid terra firme forest (including bamboo); also várzea, gallery and secondary forest, plantations near its primary habitat and river islands; feeds, roosts and nests almost entirely in the canopy and edges of terra firme; up to 1,000 m (3,300 ft) in Peru Diet: Omnivore: insects, snails, nectar, and wild and cultivated fruits; forages mostly in the canopy, individually or in flocks of up to five, occasionally joining mixed-species flocks	LC Decreasing; population size not known

In 2002 Jordan Price and Scott Lanyon studied the phylogeny of the oropendolas using mtDNA cytochrome b and NADH dehydrogenase subunit 2 sequences. As can be observed from morphology, the band-tailed (Ocyalus latirostris) and the casqued oropendolas (Psarocolius oseryi) are the most distinct species. Genetically, they appear to be more closely related to the caciques, and both species would be classified in the genus Ocyalus. Furthermore, the casqued oropendola could be separated into Clypicterus, forming what would then become a monotypic genus (like Ocyalus).

Below is a cladogram based on the 2002 phylogenetic analysis' maximum likelihood phylogenetic tree:

- Cacicus melanicterus
- - - Ocyalus latirostris
    - Psarocolius oseryi
  - - - Cacicus solitarius
      - - - Gymnostinops bifasciatus subspp.
          - Gymnostinops montezuma
        - Psarocolius decumanus subspp.
    - - Psarocolius wagleri subspp.
      - - Psarocolius atrovirens
        - Psarocolius angustifrons subspp.
