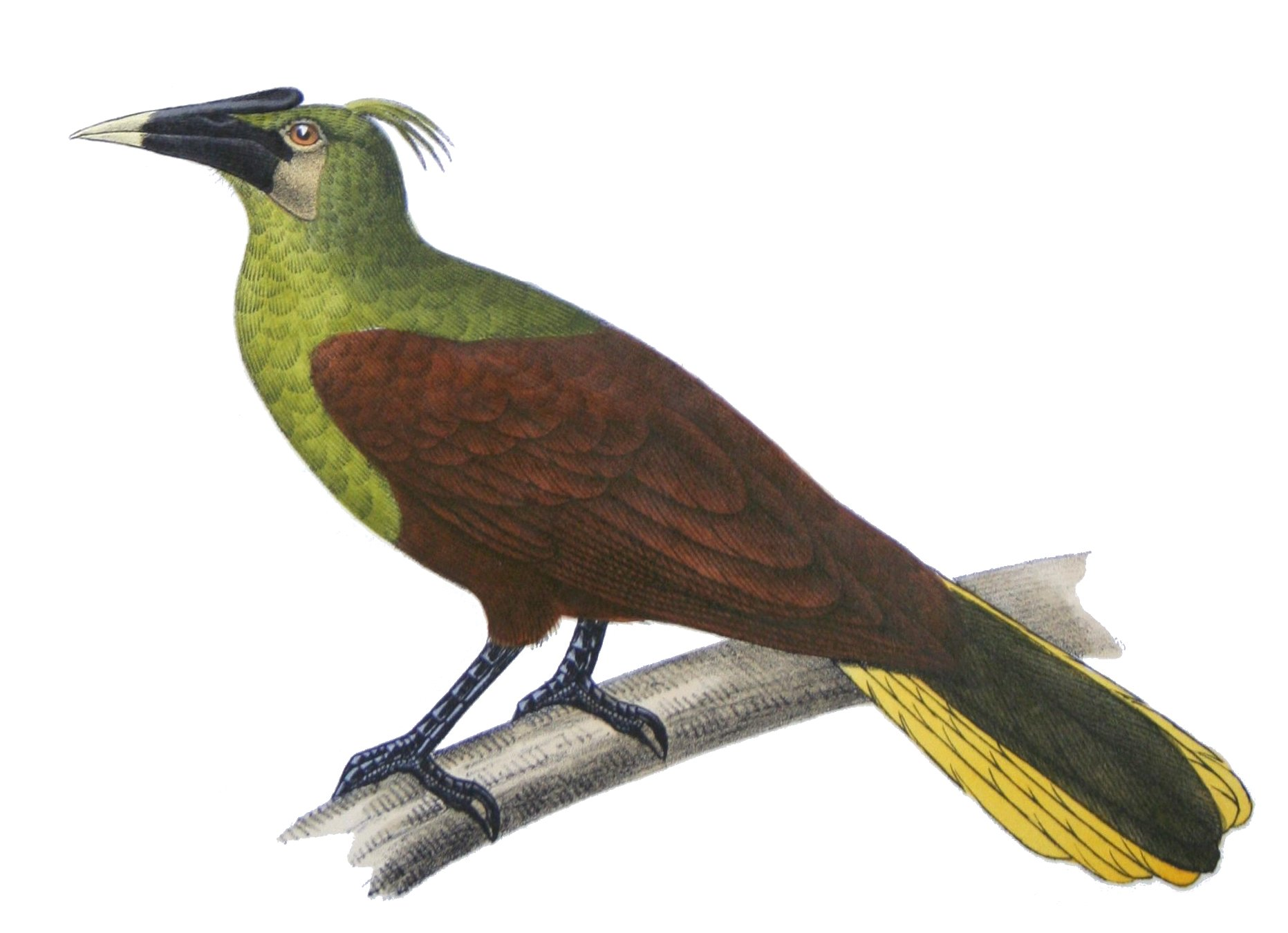

Conservation status
- Least Concern (IUCN 3.1)

Scientific classification
- Kingdom: Animalia
- Phylum: Chordata
- Class: Aves
- Order: Passeriformes
- Family: Icteridae
- Genus: Psarocolius
- Species: P. bifasciatus

Binomial name
- Psarocolius bifasciatus (Spix, 1824)

Audio

= Olive oropendola =

Species of bird

The olive oropendola (Psarocolius bifasciatus) is a species of bird in the family Icteridae, the oropendolas, New World orioles, and New World blackbirds. It is found in Brazil, Bolivia, Colombia, Ecuador, Peru, and Venezuela. It is a "spectacularly large oropendola".

== Taxonomy and systematics ==
The olive oropendola was formally described in 1824 with the binomial Cassicus bifasciatus. For a time it was placed in genus Gymnostinops which was later merged into the current Psarocolius.

The olive oropendola's further taxonomy is unsettled. As of early 2026, major taxonomic systems assign it these three subspecies:

- Psarocolius bifasciatus yuracares (d'Orbigny & Lafresnaye, 1838)
- Psarocolius bifasciatus neivae (Snethlage, E, 1925)
- Psarocolius bifasciatus bifasciatus (Spix, 1824)

Several mid-twentieth century authors treated P. b. yuracares and P. b. neivae together as a full species, the "Amazonian oropendola" and called the monotypic P. bifasciatus the "Para oropendola". Most authors accepted their merger by 2000 but a few did not. The Clements taxonomy recognizes some distinctions within the species, mirroring the earlier treatment by calling bifasciatus the "olive oropendola (Para)" and grouping the other two as the "olive oropendola (Amazonian)".

Further complicating the issue is P. b. neivae, whose range is between those of other two subspecies. "Subspecies neivae is intermediate in plumage between yuracares and bifasciatus and may represent a hybrid swarm between the two; further research [is] needed.

This article follows the three-subspecies model.

== Description ==
The olive oropendola is the largest member of its genus. Males are about 47 to 53 cm (19 to 21 in) long and females 34 to 38 cm (13 to 15 in). Adult males have long feathers on their nape that form a crest. Females lack the crest but are otherwise like males except for their smaller size and somewhat duller plumage. Adults of the nominate subspecies P. b. bifasciatus have a blackish brown head, neck, and upper breast that combined look like a hood. They have a patch of bare pinkish skin on their face. Their mantle, rump, underparts, and thighs are chestnut with a smooth transition from the blackish brown. Their wings are mostly black; the primaries and secondaries have chestnut outer edges so the folded wing looks that color. Their tail's central pair of feathers are dark brown and the rest yellow; because the dark ones are shorter than the others the tail often looks completely yellow from below. They have a large bill with a swollen casque; it is mostly black with a vermilion outer third. They have a dark brown iris and black to brownish black legs and feet.

Subspecies P. b. yuracares has a mostly yellow-olive head with a somewhat darker face and the same pink patch of skin as the nominate. Its upper back, neck, breast, and upper belly are also yellow-olive. The rest of its body is chestnut that is sharply demarcated from the yellow-olive. Its wings are mostly chestnut with black inner edges on the primaries. Its central tail feathers are olive and the rest yellow. Its bill's outer third is yellow to reddish orange, its iris is brown, and its legs and feet are black. P. b. neivae is darker overall than P. b. yuracares and more olive-green than yellow-olive. It has a deep olive crown and face and a blackish crest. The outer third of its bill is red.

== Distribution and habitat ==
The olive oropendola is a bird of the Amazon and upper Orinoco river basins. Subspecies P. b. yuracares is the most northerly of the three and has much the largest range. It is found in approximately the southeastern half of Colombia and from there east into the western parts of southern Venezuela's Amazonas and Bolívar states. From there its range continues south through eastern Ecuador and eastern Peru into central Bolivia. From those countries its range extends into Amazonian Brazil's Rondônia, Amazonas, and Acre states and east to the Negro River north of the Amazon and to the Tapajós River south of it. Subspecies P. b. neivae is found in Brazil east of yuracares from the Tapajós to the Tocantins River in northern Tocantins, northeastern Mato Grosso, and northern Goiás. The nominate P. b. bifasciatus has the smallest range, from the Tocantins eastward in eastern Pará and western Maranhão.

The olive oropendola primarily inhabits mature humid terra firme (including bamboo) forest. It also inhabits várzea, gallery, and secondary forest, plantations near its primary habitat, and river islands. Though it is often seen flying over all of these habitats, it seems to feed, roost, and nest almost entirely in the canopy and edges of terra firme. In elevation it reaches 200 m (700 ft) in Venezuela, 600 m (2,000 ft) in Colombia, 300 m (1,000 ft) in Ecuador, 1,000 m (3,300 ft) in Peru, and 500 m (1,600 ft) in Brazil.

== Behavior ==
=== Movement ===
As best is known, the olive oropendola is a year-round resident.

=== Feeding ===
The olive oropendola is an omnivore. Known components of its diet include insects, snails, nectar, and both wild and cultivated fruits. It forages mostly in the canopy but will move lower to find nectar. It forages mostly individually or in flocks of up to five of its species but will occasionally join mixed-species feeding flocks that may include other oropendola species, caciques, and jays (Corvidae). At a termite swarm it was observed to behave aggressively toward the other species.

=== Breeding ===
The olive oropendola's breeding season has not been determined across its whole range. Limited data suggest that it breeds between January and April in Venezuela. Its season in Ecuador includes January, in western Brazil it includes May, in eastern Brazil includes February, and in Bolivia includes October and November. It appears to be polygynous. It nests in colonies; most are small but up to 30 nests have been noted. Males display while singing from a perch by tipping ("bowing"), cocking their tail, and vibrating drooped wings. The nest is a bag or purse with an open top woven by the female from plant fibers. It is hung from a tree branch, often close to other nests, and often in a dead tree or one that extends above the forest canopy. Females incubate the eggs. The clutch size, egg color, incubation period, time to fledging, and other details of parental care are not known.

=== Vocal and non-vocal sounds ===
The male olive oropendola's song "has a rattling, metallic, or liquid quality, and is usually delivered as part of an abbreviated bowing display". One rendering is "tek-tk-k-k-k-gpp-guhloóp!". Another is "gr-r-r-r-r-r-GWO'WOH". The species' calls include a "soft yok, and a louder awk, or nasal raap and whrup calls in flight and when foraging".

The male seldom makes wing-flapping sounds during its display. However, in flight the species' wingbeats are "distinctive and loud".

== Status ==
The IUCN has assessed the olive oropendola as being of Least Concern. It has a very large range; its population size is not known and is believed to be decreasing. "Despite its tolerance of edge and secondary habitat the species requires patches of mature forest nearby, and selective logging for timber harvesting is considered a threat." It is "everywhere uncommon and in low density" in Venezuela, "local and uncommon" in Colombia, "somewhat rare and local" in Ecuador, "fairly common" in Peru, and "frequent to uncommon" in Brazil. The species occurs in many protected areas both private and public.

== Gallery ==
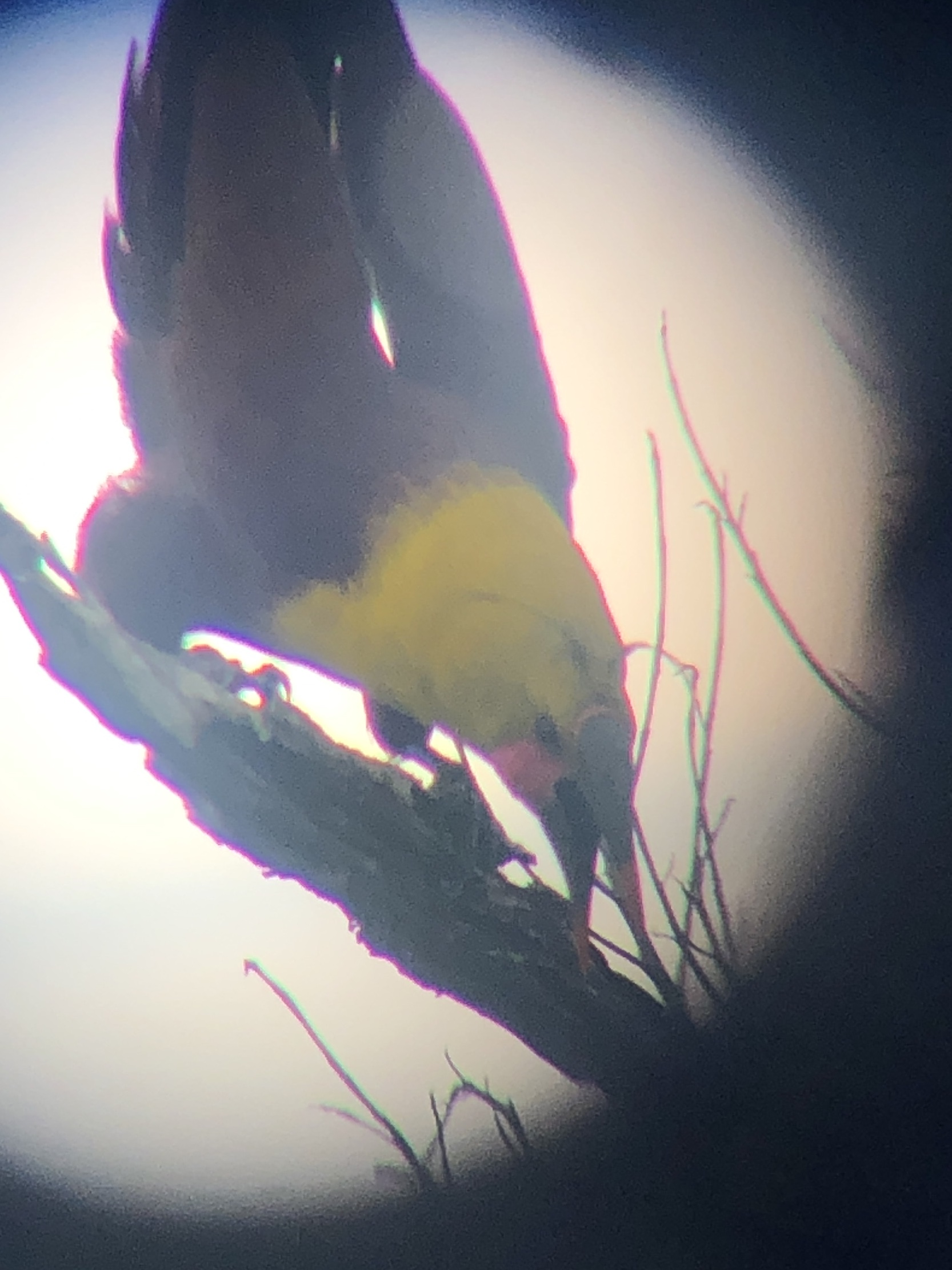
Male Olive oropendola (Psarocolius bifasciatus) in Tiputini, Ecuador mid-display

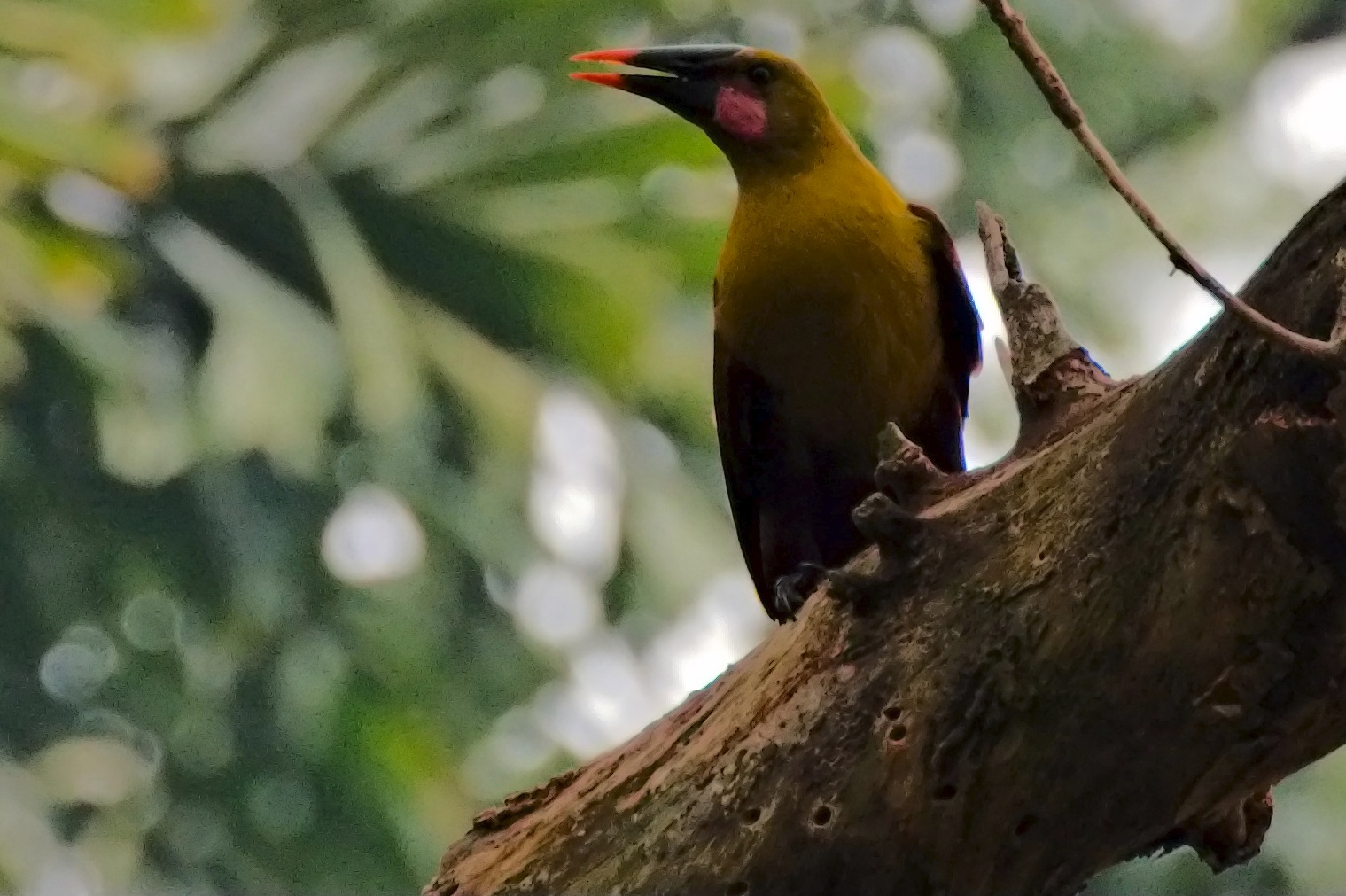
Olive oropendola
