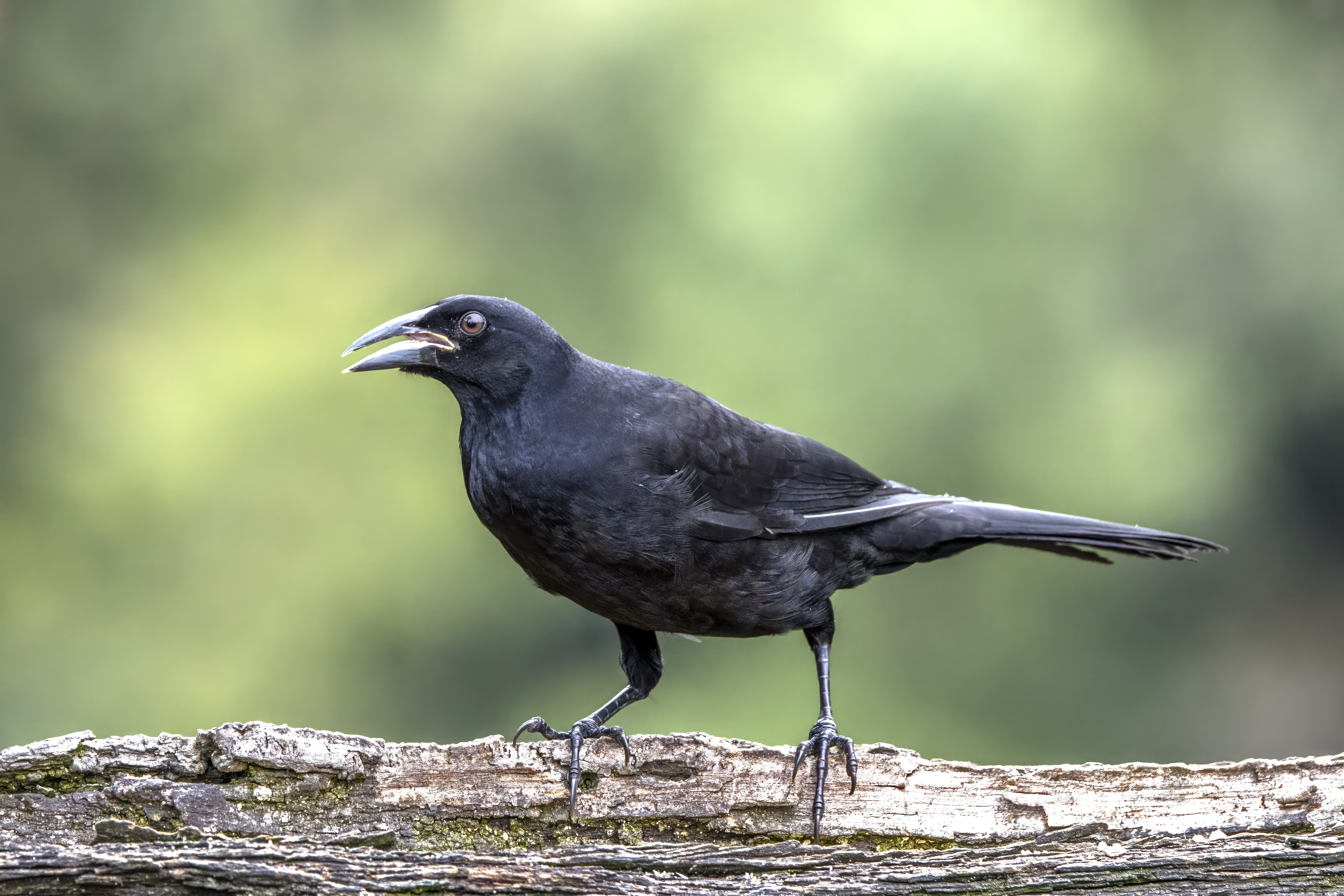
- M. o. oryzivorus in Colombia
- Giant cowbird call

Conservation status
- Least Concern (IUCN 3.1)

Scientific classification
- Kingdom: Animalia
- Phylum: Chordata
- Class: Aves
- Order: Passeriformes
- Family: Icteridae
- Genus: Molothrus
- Species: M. oryzivorus

Binomial name
- Molothrus oryzivorus (Gmelin, JF, 1788)
- Range of M. oryzivorus.

Synonyms
- Scaphidura oryzivora

= Giant cowbird =

Species of bird

The giant cowbird (Molothrus oryzivorus) is a large passerine bird in the New World family Icteridae. It breeds from southern Mexico south to northern Argentina, and on Trinidad and Tobago. It may have relatively recently colonised the latter island. It is a brood parasite and lays its eggs in the nests of other birds.

== Taxonomy ==
The giant cowbird was formally described in 1788 by the German naturalist Johann Friedrich Gmelin in his revised and expanded edition of Carl Linnaeus's Systema Naturae. He placed it with the orioles in the genus Oriolus and coined the binomial name Oriolus oryzivorus. Gmelin based his account on the "rice bird" from Cayenne that had been described in 1782 by the English ornithologist John Latham in his multi-volume work A General Synopsis of Birds. The specific epithet is from Latin oryza meaning "rice" and -vorus meaning "eating". The giant cowbird is now one of six cowbirds placed in the genus Molothrus that was introduced in 1832 by William Swainson.

Two subspecies are recognised:

- M. o. impacifus (Peters, JL, 1929) – east Mexico to west Panama
- M. o. oryzivorus (Gmelin, JF, 1788) – central Panama to Peru, Bolivia and north Argentina

== Distribution and habitat ==
It is associated with open woodland and cultivation with large trees, but is also the only cowbird that is found in deep forest.

== Description ==
The male giant cowbird is 34 cm (13 in) long, weighs 174–242 g (6.1–8.5 oz) and is iridescent black, with a long tail, long bill, small head, and a neck ruff which is expanded in display. The female is smaller, averaging 29 cm (11 in) in length and weighing 144–167 g (5.1–5.9 oz). The female is less iridescent than the male, and the absence of the neck ruff makes her look less small-headed. Juvenile males are similar to the adult male, but browner, and with a pale, not black, bill.

It is a quiet bird, particularly for an icterid, but the male has an unpleasant screeched whistle, shweeaa-tpic-tpic. The call is a sharp chek-chik. They are also very adept mimics.

== Behaviour ==
=== Breeding ===
Like other cowbirds, it is a brood parasite, laying its eggs in the nests of oropendolas and caciques. The eggs are of two types, either whitish and unspotted, or pale blue or green with dark spots and blotches. The host's eggs and chicks are not destroyed. Their icterid hosts breed colonially, and defend their nests vigorously, so even a large, bold and aggressive species like the giant cowbird has to cover an extensive territory to find sufficient egg-laying opportunities. Several giant cowbird eggs may be laid in one host nest.

=== Food and feeding ===
This gregarious bird feeds mainly on insects, and some seeds, including rice, and forages on the ground or in trees. It also searches for fruit, nectar, and arthropods along lakes and rivers, and in banana plantations and corn. It rarely perches on cattle, unlike some of its relatives, but in Brazil it will ride on capybaras as it removes ticks and/or horse flies.
