= List of icterid species =

The avian family Icteridae is variously called icterids, troupials and allies, or oropendolas, orioles, blackbirds by taxonomic authorities. The family comprise the New World blackbirds, New World orioles, grackles, cowbirds, oropendolas, and several smaller groups. The International Ornithological Committee (IOC) recognizes these 108 species distributed among 30 genera, 14 of which have only one species. One extinct species, the slender-billed grackle, is included.

This list is presented according to the IOC taxonomic sequence and can also be sorted alphabetically by common name and binomial.

Common name	Binomial name	IOC sequence	Image
Yellow-headed blackbird	Xanthocephalus xanthocephalus (Bonaparte, 1826)	1	
Bobolink	Dolichonyx oryzivorus (Linnaeus, 1758)	2	
Western meadowlark	Sturnella neglecta Audubon, 1844	3	
Eastern meadowlark	Sturnella magna (Linnaeus, 1758)	4	
Chihuahuan meadowlark	Sturnella lilianae Oberholser, 1930	5	
Red-breasted meadowlark	Leistes militaris (Linnaeus, 1758)	6	
White-browed meadowlark	Leistes superciliaris (Bonaparte, 1850)	7	
Peruvian meadowlark	Leistes bellicosus (de Filippi, 1847)	8	
Long-tailed meadowlark	Leistes loyca (Molina, 1782)	9	
Pampas meadowlark	Leistes defilippii (Bonaparte, 1850)	10	
Yellow-billed cacique	Amblycercus holosericeus (Deppe, 1830)	11	
Mexican cacique	Cassiculus melanicterus (Bonaparte, 1825)	12	
Chestnut-headed oropendola	Psarocolius wagleri (Gray, GR, 1844)	13	
Russet-backed oropendola	Psarocolius angustifrons (Spix, 1824)	14	
Dusky-green oropendola	Psarocolius atrovirens (d'Orbigny & Lafresnaye, 1838)	15	
Crested oropendola	Psarocolius decumanus (Pallas, 1769)	16	
Green oropendola	Psarocolius viridis (Müller, PLS, 1776)	17	
Olive oropendola	Psarocolius bifasciatus (Spix, 1824)	18	
Montezuma oropendola	Psarocolius montezuma (Lesson, RP, 1830)	19	
Black oropendola	Psarocolius guatimozinus (Bonaparte, 1853)	20	
Baudo oropendola	Psarocolius cassini (Richmond, 1898)	21	
Solitary cacique	Cacicus solitarius Vieillot, 1816	22	
Golden-winged cacique	Cacicus chrysopterus (Vigors, 1825)	23	
Selva cacique	Cacicus koepckeae Lowery & O'Neill, 1965	24	
Ecuadorian cacique	Cacicus sclateri (Dubois, AJC, 1887)	25	
Yellow-rumped cacique	Cacicus cela (Linnaeus, 1758)	26	
Scarlet-rumped cacique	Cacicus microrhynchus (Sclater, PL & Salvin, 1865)	27	
Subtropical cacique	Cacicus uropygialis Lafresnaye, 1843	28	
Mountain cacique	Cacicus chrysonotus d'Orbigny & Lafresnaye, 1838	29	
Band-tailed cacique	Cacicus latirostris Swainson, 1838	30	
Casqued cacique	Cacicus oseryi Deville, 1849	31	
Red-rumped cacique	Cacicus haemorrhous (Linnaeus, 1766)	32	
Scott's oriole	Icterus parisorum Bonaparte, 1838	33	
Yellow-backed oriole	Icterus chrysater (Lesson, RP, 1844)	34	
Audubon's oriole	Icterus graduacauda Lesson, RP, 1839	35	
Jamaican oriole	Icterus leucopteryx (Wagler, 1827)	36	
Orange oriole	Icterus auratus Bonaparte, 1850	37	
Altamira oriole	Icterus gularis (Wagler, 1829)	38	
Yellow oriole	Icterus nigrogularis (Hahn, 1819)	39	
Bullock's oriole	Icterus bullockii (Swainson, 1827)	40	
Streak-backed oriole	Icterus pustulatus (Wagler, 1829)	41	
Black-backed oriole	Icterus abeillei (Lesson, RP, 1839)	42	
Baltimore oriole	Icterus galbula (Linnaeus, 1758)	43	
Yellow-tailed oriole	Icterus mesomelas (Wagler, 1829)	44	
Spot-breasted oriole	Icterus pectoralis (Wagler, 1829)	45	
White-edged oriole	Icterus graceannae Cassin, 1867	46	
Campo troupial	Icterus jamacaii (Gmelin, JF, 1788)	47	
Venezuelan troupial	Icterus icterus (Linnaeus, 1766)	48	
Orange-backed troupial	Icterus croconotus (Wagler, 1829)	49	
Bar-winged oriole	Icterus maculialatus Cassin, 1848	50	
Black-vented oriole	Icterus wagleri Sclater, PL, 1857	51	
Hooded oriole	Icterus cucullatus Swainson, 1827	52	
Black-cowled oriole	Icterus prosthemelas (Strickland, 1850)	53	
Orchard oriole	Icterus spurius (Linnaeus, 1766)	54	
Cuban oriole	Icterus melanopsis (Wagler, 1829)	55	
Bahama oriole	Icterus northropi Allen, JA, 1890	56	
Martinique oriole	Icterus bonana (Linnaeus, 1766)	57	
Puerto Rican oriole	Icterus portoricensis Bryant, H, 1866	58	
Montserrat oriole	Icterus oberi Lawrence, 1880	59	
St. Lucia oriole	Icterus laudabilis Sclater, PL, 1871	60	
Hispaniolan oriole	Icterus dominicensis (Linnaeus, 1766)	61	
Orange-crowned oriole	Icterus auricapillus Cassin, 1848	62	
Variable oriole	Icterus pyrrhopterus (Vieillot, 1819)	63	
Epaulet oriole	Icterus cayanensis (Linnaeus, 1766)	64	
Jamaican blackbird	Nesopsar nigerrimus (Osburn, 1859)	65	
Yellow-shouldered blackbird	Agelaius xanthomus (Sclater, PL, 1862)	66	
Tawny-shouldered blackbird	Agelaius humeralis (Vigors, 1827)	67	
Tricolored blackbird	Agelaius tricolor (Audubon, 1837)	68	
Red-winged blackbird	Agelaius phoeniceus (Linnaeus, 1766)	69	
Red-shouldered blackbird	Agelaius assimilis Lembeye, 1850	70	
Screaming cowbird	Molothrus rufoaxillaris Cassin, 1866	71	
Giant cowbird	Molothrus oryzivorus (Gmelin, JF, 1788)	72	
Shiny cowbird	Molothrus bonariensis (Gmelin, JF, 1789)	73	
Bronzed cowbird	Molothrus aeneus (Wagler, 1829)	74	
Bronze-brown cowbird	Molothrus armenti Cabanis, 1851	75	
Brown-headed cowbird	Molothrus ater (Boddaert, 1783)	76	
Scrub blackbird	Dives warczewiczi (Cabanis, 1861)	77	
Melodious blackbird	Dives dives (Deppe, 1830)	78	
Cuban blackbird	Ptiloxena atroviolacea (d'Orbigny, 1839)	79	
Rusty blackbird	Euphagus carolinus (Müller, PLS, 1776)	80	
Brewer's blackbird	Euphagus cyanocephalus (Wagler, 1829)	81	
Common grackle	Quiscalus quiscula (Linnaeus, 1758)	82	
Nicaraguan grackle	Quiscalus nicaraguensis Salvin & Godman, 1891	83	
Carib grackle	Quiscalus lugubris Swainson, 1838	84	
Greater Antillean grackle	Quiscalus niger (Boddaert, 1783)	85	
Boat-tailed grackle	Quiscalus major Vieillot, 1819	86	
Great-tailed grackle	Quiscalus mexicanus (Gmelin, JF, 1788)	87	
Slender-billed grackle	Quiscalus palustris (Swainson, 1827)	88	
Red-bellied grackle	Hypopyrrhus pyrohypogaster (de Tarragon, L, 1847)	89	
Velvet-fronted grackle	Lampropsar tanagrinus (Spix, 1824)	90	
Oriole blackbird	Gymnomystax mexicanus (Linnaeus, 1766)	91	
Colombian mountain grackle	Macroagelaius subalaris (Boissonneau, 1840)	92	
Golden-tufted mountain grackle	Macroagelaius imthurni (Sclater, PL, 1881)	93	
Austral blackbird	Curaeus curaeus (Molina, 1782)	94	
Scarlet-headed blackbird	Amblyramphus holosericeus (Scopoli, 1786)	95	
Forbes's blackbird	Anumara forbesi (Sclater, PL, 1886)	96	
Chopi blackbird	Gnorimopsar chopi (Vieillot, 1819)	97	
Bolivian blackbird	Oreopsar bolivianus Sclater, WL, 1939	98	
Greyish baywing	Agelaioides badius (Vieillot, 1819)	99	
Pale baywing	Agelaioides fringillarius (Spix, 1824)	100	
Yellow-winged blackbird	Agelasticus thilius (Molina, 1782)	101	
Pale-eyed blackbird	Agelasticus xanthophthalmus (Short, 1969)	102	
Unicolored blackbird	Agelasticus cyanopus (Vieillot, 1819)	103	
Chestnut-capped blackbird	Chrysomus ruficapillus (Vieillot, 1819)	104	
Yellow-hooded blackbird	Chrysomus icterocephalus (Linnaeus, 1766)	105	
Saffron-cowled blackbird	Xanthopsar flavus (Gmelin, JF, 1788)	106	
Brown-and-yellow marshbird	Pseudoleistes virescens (Vieillot, 1819)	107	
Yellow-rumped marshbird	Pseudoleistes guirahuro (Vieillot, 1819)	108	
