= Troupial =

There are three extant species of bird in the genus Icterus that are named troupial (turpial in Spanish), formerly considered one species:

- Venezuelan troupial, Icterus icterus
- Campo troupial, Icterus jamacaii
- Orange-backed troupial, Icterus croconotus

In addition, one extinct species, the Talara troupial (Icterus turmalis) is known from late Quaternary fossil remains from Peru.
