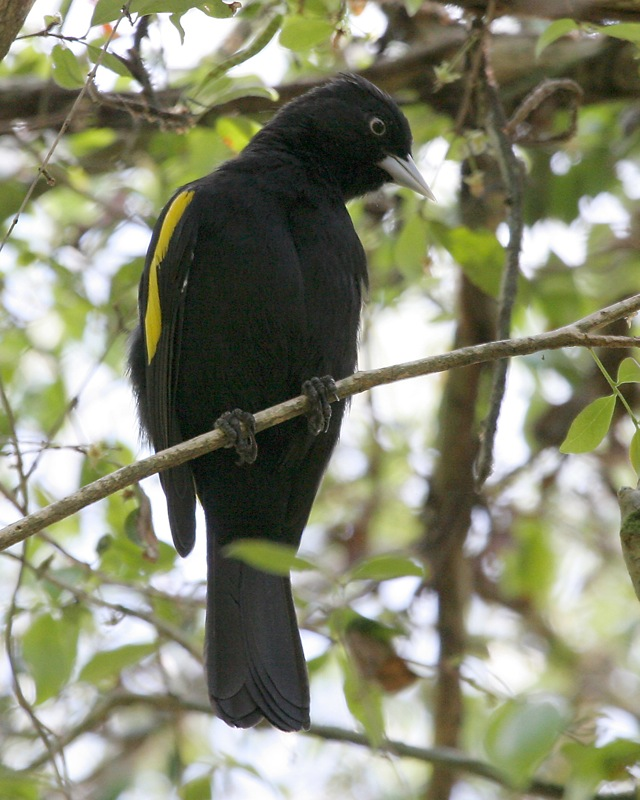
- Golden-winged cacique

Scientific classification
- Kingdom: Animalia
- Phylum: Chordata
- Class: Aves
- Order: Passeriformes
- Family: Icteridae
- Genus: Cacicus; Lacépède, 1799

Type species
- Oriolus haemorrhous Linnaeus, 1766

Species
- See text.

= Cacique (bird) =

Caciques

Passerine birds in the New World blackbird family

The caciques are passerine birds in the New World blackbird family which are resident breeders in tropical South America north to Mexico. All of the group are in currently placed in the genus Cacicus, except the aberrant yellow-billed cacique (Amblycercus holosericeus), and the Mexican cacique (Cassiculus melanicterus) which constitute respective monotypic genera. Judging from mitochondrial DNA cytochrome b and NADH dehydrogenase subunit 2 sequence (Price & Lanyon 2002), the aberrant oropendolas band-tailed oropendola (Ocyalus latirostris) and casqued oropendola, Psarocolius oseryi (Ocyalus oseryi?) seem to be closer to the caciques.

== Taxonomy ==
The genus Cacicus was introduced by the French naturalist Bernard Germain de Lacépède in 1799. The type species was subsequently designated as the red-rumped cacique (Cacicus haemorrhous).

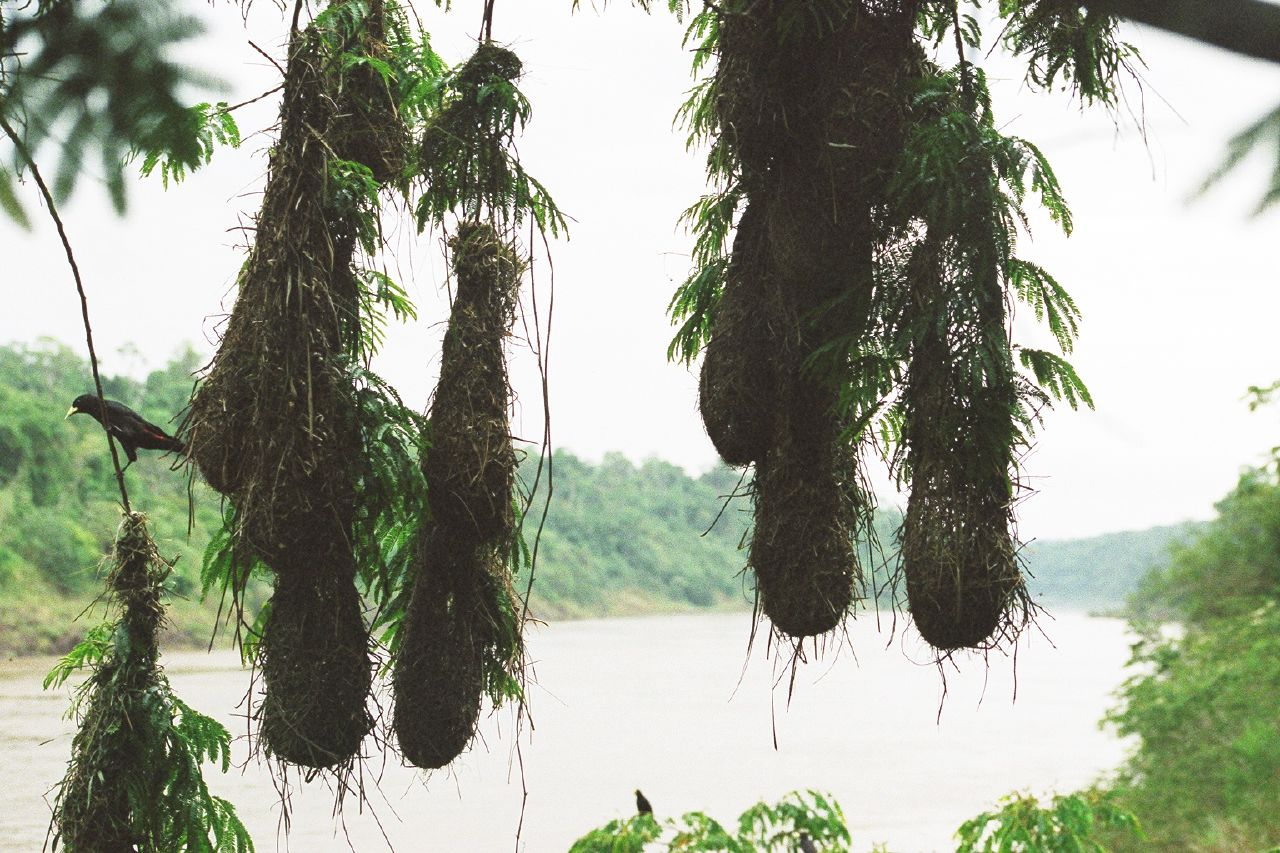
Nesting colony of the red-rumped cacique (a single bird perched center-left)

The caciques are birds associated with woodland or forest. Most are colonial breeders, with several long, hanging, bag-shaped nests in a tree, each suspended from the end of a branch. Some species choose a tree that also contains an active wasp nest (such as Polybia rejecta) as a deterrent to predators (e.g. toucans), and females compete for the best sites near the protection of the wasp nest. The eggs are incubated by the female alone.

These are slim birds with long tails and a predominantly black plumage. The relatively long pointed bill is pale greenish, yellowish or bluish, depending on species, and most caciques have blue eyes (at least when adult). The female is typically smaller than the male.

Two species have the black plumage enlivened by a red rump, five have a yellow rump and in some cases yellow on the shoulders or crissum (the undertail coverts surrounding the cloaca). The two remaining species are all black with no bright colour patches. A single species, the Mexican cacique, has extensive yellow to the tail, but otherwise all caciques have largely black tails (something that separates them from the larger oropendolas).

Caciques eat large insects and fruit. Most are gregarious and typically seen in small groups. They are very vocal, producing a wide range of songs, sometimes including mimicry.

Most remain fairly common and are able to withstand some habitat modifications, but two west Amazonian species, the Ecuadorian and Selva caciques, are notably local and scarce.

== Species ==
The genus contains the following 10 species.

Image	Scientific name	Common name	Distribution
	Cacicus solitarius	Solitary cacique	Argentina, Bolivia, Brazil, Colombia, Ecuador, Paraguay, Peru, Uruguay and Venezuela
	Cacicus chrysopterus	Golden-winged cacique	Argentina, Bolivia, Brazil, Paraguay and Uruguay
	Cacicus koepckeae	Selva cacique	Peru
	Cacicus sclateri	Ecuadorian cacique	Colombia, eastern Ecuador and northeastern Peru
	Cacicus cela	Yellow-rumped cacique	South America from Panama and Trinidad south to Peru, Bolivia and central Brazil
	Cacicus uropygialis	Scarlet-rumped cacique	southeastern Honduras south to Peru
	Cacicus chrysonotus	Mountain cacique	Bolivia, Colombia, Ecuador, Peru and Venezuela
	Cacicus latirostris	Band-tailed cacique	western Amazon in Brazil, Ecuador, Peru and far southern Colombia
	Cacicus oseryi	Casqued cacique	Bolivia, Brazil, Ecuador and Peru
	Cacicus haemorrhous	Red-rumped cacique	south-eastern and coastal Brazil, including Paraguay, and parts of north-eastern Argentina

== See also ==
- Mexican cacique, Cassiculus melanicterus
- Yellow-billed cacique, Amblycercus holosericeus
