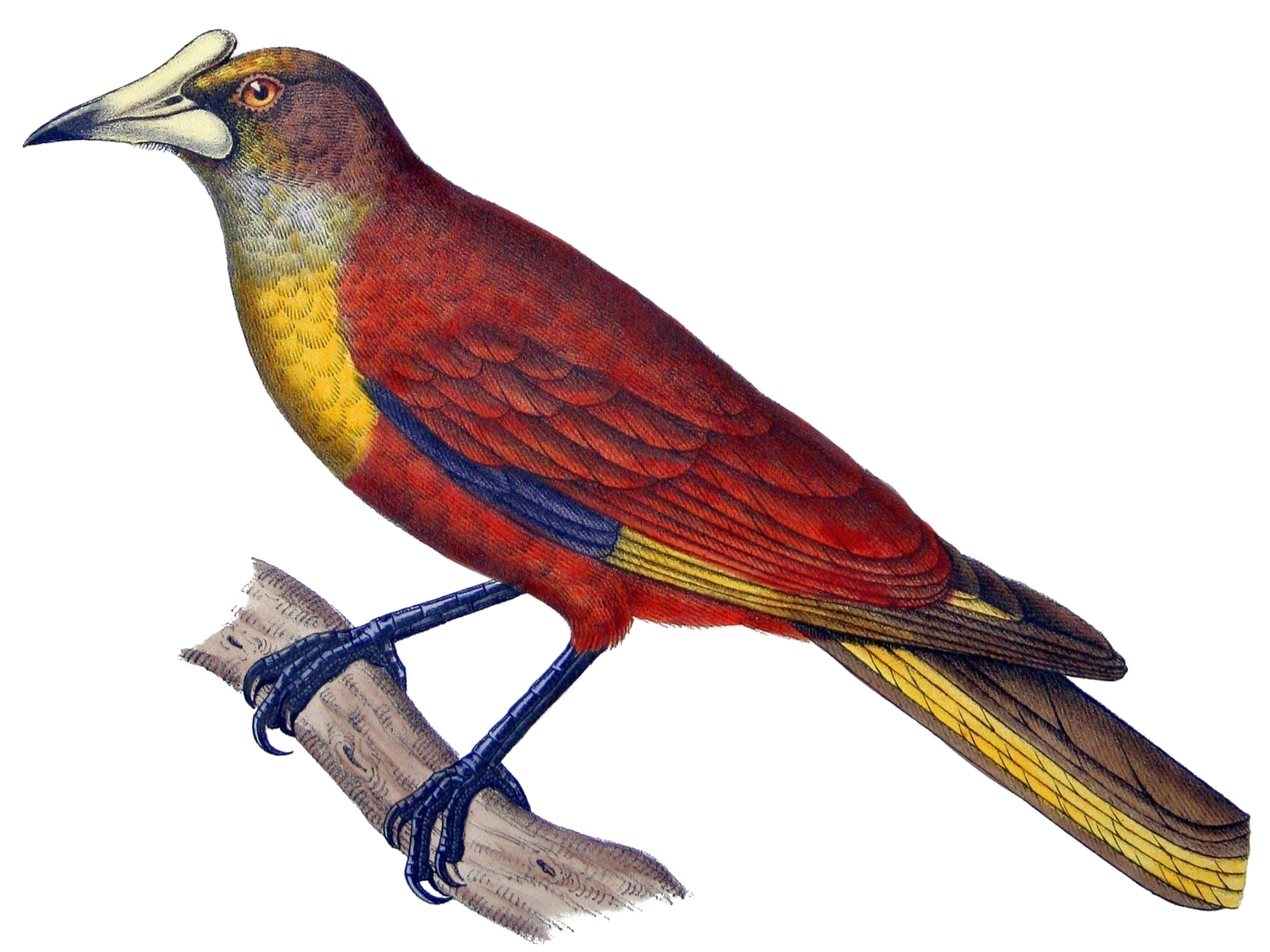

Conservation status
- Least Concern (IUCN 3.1)

Scientific classification
- Kingdom: Animalia
- Phylum: Chordata
- Class: Aves
- Order: Passeriformes
- Family: Icteridae
- Genus: Cacicus
- Species: C. oseryi

Binomial name
- Cacicus oseryi Deville, 1849

Synonyms
- See text

= Casqued cacique =

Species of bird

The casqued cacique (Cacicus oseryi) is a species of bird in the family Icteridae, the oropendolas, New World orioles, and New World blackbirds. It is found in Brazil, Colombia, Ecuador, Peru, and possibly Bolivia.

== Taxonomy and systematics ==
The casqued cacique has a complicated taxonomic history. It was formally described in 1849 with its current binomial Cacicus Oseryi [sic]. During the twentieth century it bounced between genera Clypicterus and Psarocolius. By the twenty-first century Psarocolius was no longer used and in the 2010s Clypicterus was merged into Cacicus. During its time as Psarocolius oseryi and Clypicterus oseryi it was called the "casqued oropendola".

The casqued cacique is monotypic.

== Description ==
Male casqued caciques average 37 cm (15 in) long and 188 g (6.6 oz). Females average 29 cm (11 in) long and 101 g (3.6 oz). Males have a prominent casque and females a smaller one. The casque's color is usually yellowish gray to olivaceous gray, sometimes ivory-colored with a greenish tinge and a dark gray tip, and sometimes entirely dark gray. The sexes have the same plumage. Adults are mostly rich chestnut. Their tail is mostly dusky olive with bright yellow outer feathers. Their wing's flight feathers have yellow edges. Their throat is grayish olive and their upper breast and the side of their neck are yellowish olive. They have a pale blue iris and black legs and feet. Their bill is variable but usually has a dark gray maxilla and a yellow-green mandible with a dark gray tip. Juveniles are like adults but have dark eyes.

== Distribution and habitat ==
The casqued cacique is a bird of the extreme western Amazon Basin. Its range includes extreme southern Amazonas Department in far southern Colombia and the three eastern Ecuadorean provinces of Sucumbíos, Orellana, and Pastaza. Its range continues south through the eastern half of Peru and extends east from Peru very slightly into the far western parts of Brazil's Amazonas and Acre states. Though most sources include northern Bolivia in the species' range, the South American Classification Committee has only unconfirmed records there.

The casqued cacique inhabits terra firme and várzea forest. It appears to breed primarily in várzea and use the drier terra firme for foraging and in the non-breeding season. In elevation it is found below about 300 m (1,000 ft) in Colombia and Ecuador, below 1,000 m (3,300 ft) in Peru, and below 400 m (1,300 ft) in Brazil.

== Behavior ==
=== Movement ===
The casqued cacique is believed to be a sedentary year-round resident.

=== Feeding ===
The casqued cacique's diet is known to include fruits and is assumed to also include arthropods, small vertebrates, and nectar. It has been observed foraging with flocks of yellow-rumped caciques (C. cela). It forages mostly in the forest interior.

=== Breeding ===
The casqued cacique's breeding season has not been fully defined but spans at least September to November in Peru. It is polygynous and nests in colonies that typically have 14 to 25 nests and are along small rivers. Females build the nest, an elongated open-topped bag or purse woven from plant fibers and hanging from a tree branch. All known colonies in Peru were in isolated Cecropia trees. The female incubates the clutch; males guard the colony from predators such as monkeys and toucans (Ramphastidae). The clutch size, incubation period, time to fledging, and other details of parental care are not known.

=== Vocalization ===
The casqued cacique's song is "a descending loud, electric, buzzing tok'DJZZEEEEEEEROP. Its "loud, squawking calls" include a "zhrak! and a repeated zhreeo! zhreeo! zhreeo", and displaying males "give a long squa-a-a-a-a-ooók! and a ringing ko-kooó-glee!".

== Status ==
The IUCN has assessed the casqued cacique as being of Least Concern. It has a large range; its population size is not known but is believed to be stable. No immediate threats have been identified. It is considered "very local and uncommon" in Colombia, "scarce" in Ecuador, and "uncommon to locally fairly common" in Peru. It has only a few records in Brazil. It occurs in several protected areas.
