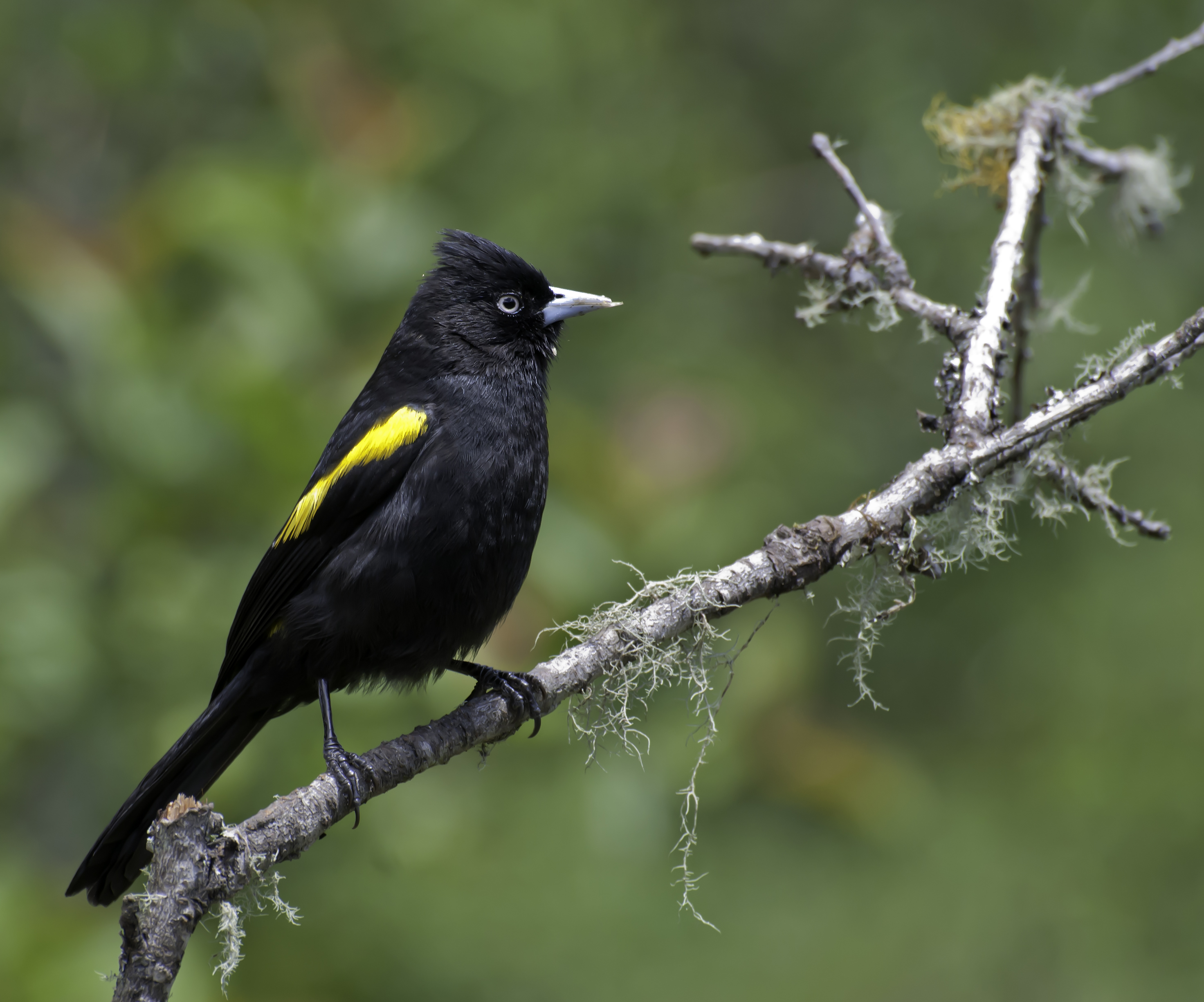
- At Reserva Guainumbi, São Luíz do Paraitinga, São Paulo, Brazil

Conservation status
- Least Concern (IUCN 3.1)

Scientific classification
- Kingdom: Animalia
- Phylum: Chordata
- Class: Aves
- Order: Passeriformes
- Family: Icteridae
- Genus: Cacicus
- Species: C. chrysopterus

Binomial name
- Cacicus chrysopterus (Vigors, 1825)
- Range of Cacicus chrysopterus

Synonyms
- See text

= Golden-winged cacique =

Species of bird

The golden-winged cacique (Cacicus chrysopterus) is a species of bird in the family Icteridae, the oropendolas, New World orioles, and New World blackbirds. It is found in Argentina, Bolivia, Brazil, Paraguay, and Uruguay.

== Taxonomy and systematics ==
The golden-winged cacique has a complicated taxonomic history. It was formally described in 1825 with the binomial Xanthornus Chrysopterus [sic]. In the first half of the twentieth century it was known as Archiplanus albirostris. When Archiplanus was merged into the current genus Cacicus later in the century, the binomial "Cacicus albirostris" already applied to another species so by the principle of priority the golden-winged cacique's specific epithet was returned to chrysopterus.

The golden-winged cacique is monotypic.

== Description ==
Male golden-winged caciques are about 21 cm (8.3 in) long and females about 19 cm (7.5 in). Males weigh about 35 to 47 g (1.2 to 1.7 oz) and females about 30 to 34 g (1.1 to 1.2 oz). The sexes have the same plumage. Adults are almost entirely black. Their lower rump and their median and inner greater wing coverts are bright yellow. They have a pearly white to yellow iris, a pale bluish gray bill, and black legs and feet. Juveniles are duller overall than adults and have dark eyes.

== Distribution and habitat ==
Sources differ on the range of the golden-winged cacique. Some state that it has a disjunct distribution with ranges of significantly different sizes. The smaller range extends in a narrow band from central Bolivia south to Tucuman Province in northwestern Argentina. The larger includes the eastern two-thirds of Paraguay, much of northeastern Argentina, the northern half of Uruguay, and Brazil south of a line that roughly follows from western Mato Grosso do Sul to northern Paraná to western Rio de Janeiro state. Other sources assign it a continuous range that connects the areas that the others keep separate.

In its far western range the golden-winged cacique inhabits the Yungas forest along the eastern slope of the Andes. In its large range it inhabits humid to mesic Chaco woodlands and gallery forest, Atlantic forest, and the transitional forests between the Chaco and the Atlantic. In elevation it reaches 2,800 m (9,200 ft) in the west and 2,000 m (6,600 ft) in Brazil.

== Behavior ==
=== Movement ===
The golden-winged cacique is not a conventional migrant but some elevational movements have been noted in northwestern Argentina.

=== Feeding ===
The golden-winged cacique feeds on insects, other invertebrates, small vertebrates, nectar, and wild and cultivated fruits. It typically finds prey by probing bark, insect galls, and epiphytes, sometimes spreading its beak ("gaping") to expose it. It feeds mostly in trees and sometimes hangs upside down when feeding. It usually forages in pairs or family groups but has been seen in flocks of up to 30 individuals in the non-breeding season. It often joins mixed-species feeding flocks that include other icterids.

=== Breeding ===
The golden-winged cacique breeds between October and December in Argentina; its season elsewhere is not known. It is monogamous and nests solitarily rather than in colonies. Females build the nest, a long bag or purse usually woven from Marasmius fungal rhizomorphs. It typically hangs from a branch tip and often is over water. The clutch is usually three eggs but two to four are known; they are white with brownish spots. The female incubates for about 14 to 15 days and fledging occurs 18 to 19 days after hatch. Both parents provision nestlings. Nests are sometimes taken over by piratic flycatchers (Legatus heucophaius) and are parasitized by shiny cowbirds (Molothrus bonariensis).

=== Vocalization ===
Male golden-winged caciques display on a perch by singing and "bowing". Their song is an "unexpected and varied, musical rrrreee-chiroo, whooo, tooweetooweetoowee-teeeeay (very high-pitched) whooweet, whooway, teeoo...". Its calls include a "mewing eyehh or [a] thin, slightly upslurred whee".

== Status ==
The IUCN has assessed the golden-winged cacique as being of Least Concern. It has a very large range; its population size is not known but is believed to be stable. No immediate threats have been identified. It is "[r]ather abundant, particularly in mesic subtropical forests and woodland; rare or local in drier W Chaco of Bolivia, Paraguay and Argentina". It is somewhat tolerant of moderate disturbance of its habitat and is found in several protected areas.
