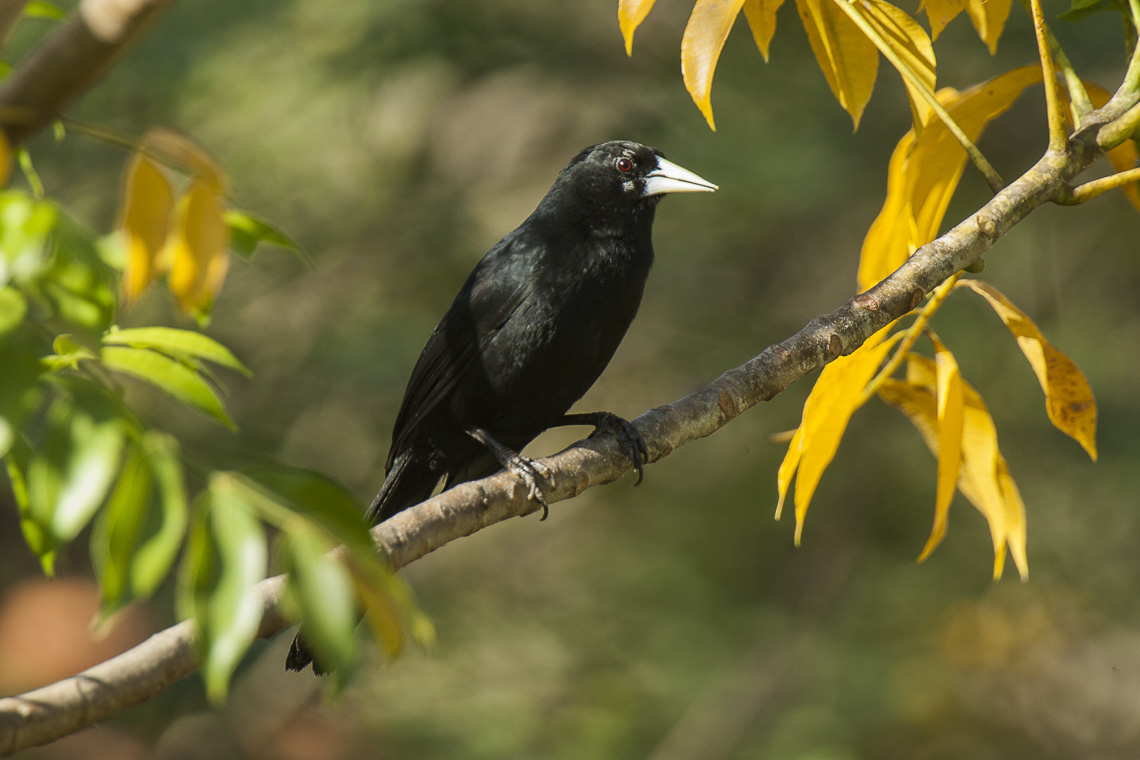

Conservation status
- Least Concern (IUCN 3.1)

Scientific classification
- Kingdom: Animalia
- Phylum: Chordata
- Class: Aves
- Order: Passeriformes
- Family: Icteridae
- Genus: Cacicus
- Species: C. solitarius

Binomial name
- Cacicus solitarius Vieillot, 1816
- Range of Cacicus solitarius

= Solitary cacique =

Species of bird

The solitary cacique or solitary black cacique (Cacicus solitarius) is a species of bird in the family Icteridae.

It is found in Argentina, Bolivia, Brazil, Colombia, Ecuador, Paraguay, Peru, Uruguay, and Venezuela. Its natural habitats are subtropical or tropical moist lowland forests, subtropical or tropical swamps, and heavily degraded former forest. It is a fairly common bird with a very extensive range so the IUCN has rated it as a "species of least concern".

== Description ==
The male solitary cacique has a length of about 27 cm (10.6 in) and the female 23 cm (9.1 in). It differs from all other entirely black birds with dark irises within its range, by having a large white, chisel-shaped, sharply-pointed beak. It could be confused with the Ecuadorian cacique (Cacicus sclateri), but that is smaller and has a restricted range, or the yellow-billed cacique (Amblycercus holosericeus), but that is not found east of the Andes. It has a range of different vocalizations which are mostly delivered at a measured pace but are sometimes interrupted by gurgles and growls.

== Distribution and habitat ==
The solitary cacique has a very wide distribution in Amazonia. Its range extends southwards as far as northern Argentina and Uruguay at altitudes of up to about 800 m (2,625 ft). It inhabits forests, gallery forests and flooded areas. It is generally found in the mid-storey of the canopy, or the shrubby understorey, often clambering about among dense vines.

== Ecology ==
The solitary cacique is often found singly or in pairs but does not join flocks of birds. It forages in tangled undergrowth and is acrobatic, sometimes hanging upside-down. At times it visits flowering trees higher in the canopy. Its diet consists of invertebrates and small vertebrates such as tree frogs, and it also consumes fruit and nectar. Breeding takes place between October and January according to location and in Argentina it is thought that two broods are reared. Many birds in this genus build their nests in colonies, but this bird nests alone.

== Status ==
The solitary cacique has an extremely large range, its area of occupancy being estimated as 8,790,000 km^{2} (3,400,000 mi^{2}). It is a fairly common species, and although the population trend has not been quantified, the population is thought to be stable, so the International Union for Conservation of Nature has assessed the bird's conservation status as being of "least concern".
