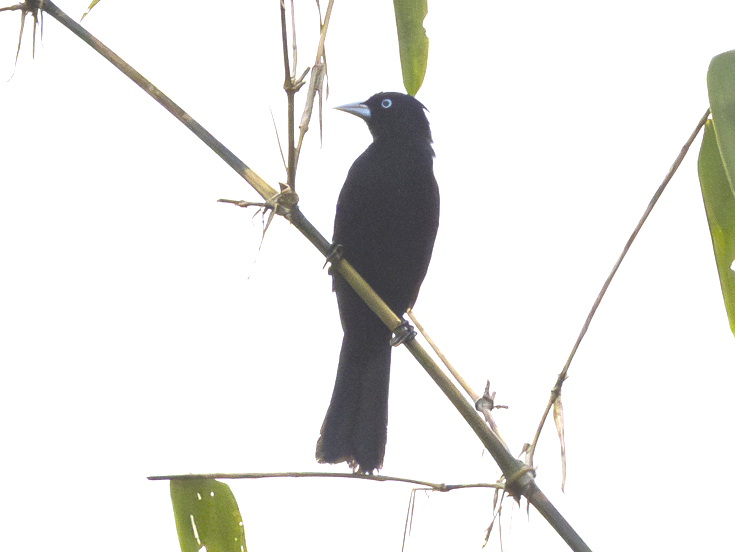

Conservation status
- Near Threatened (IUCN 3.1)

Scientific classification
- Kingdom: Animalia
- Phylum: Chordata
- Class: Aves
- Order: Passeriformes
- Family: Icteridae
- Genus: Cacicus
- Species: C. koepckeae

Binomial name
- Cacicus koepckeae Lowery & O'Neill, 1965

= Selva cacique =

Species of bird

The Selva cacique (Cacicus koepckeae) is a species of bird in the family Icteridae. It is endemic to Peru where its natural habitat consists of subtropical or tropical moist lowland forests. It is an uncommon and elusive bird and it is threatened by habitat destruction; the population is thought to be declining rapidly and the International Union for Conservation of Nature has assessed the bird's conservation status as being "Near Threatened".

== Description ==
The Selva cacique is entirely black except for a distinctive yellow rump and yellow upper-tail coverts. It is a slender long-tailed bird with a total length of about 23 cm (9 in). The beak and irises are bluish-white while the legs are dark.

== Distribution and habitat ==
The Selva cacique is endemic to eastern Peru where it is found in the regions of Ucayali, Cusco and Madre de Dios, and the adjoining Acre State in northwestern Brazil. It typically inhabits dense riverside vegetation in forested areas near small rivers and streams, in lowland areas and low foothills at elevations between 300 and 575 m (1,000 and 1,900 ft).

== Ecology ==
The Selva cacique has been little studied but its behaviour is thought to be similar to that of the Ecuadorian cacique (Cacicus sclateri). It may move through the forest alone or in pairs, or it may do so as part of a small group. Six birds were seen bathing and drinking together by one observer. The birds forage through the canopy and have been observed probing into clumps of seedpods, perhaps for insects, while not feeding in nearby fruit-laden trees.

== Status ==
The lowland rainforest is being steadily reduced in area as it is cleared for agricultural purposes, and this bird's numbers are also thought to be decreasing. It was never a common bird and is becoming more localised, and the International Union for Conservation of Nature estimates there may be between 2,500 and 10,000 mature individuals in total. However, the remoteness of its habitat means it is at a lower risk than other species. The conservation status of this bird has therefore been assessed as "Near Threatened".
