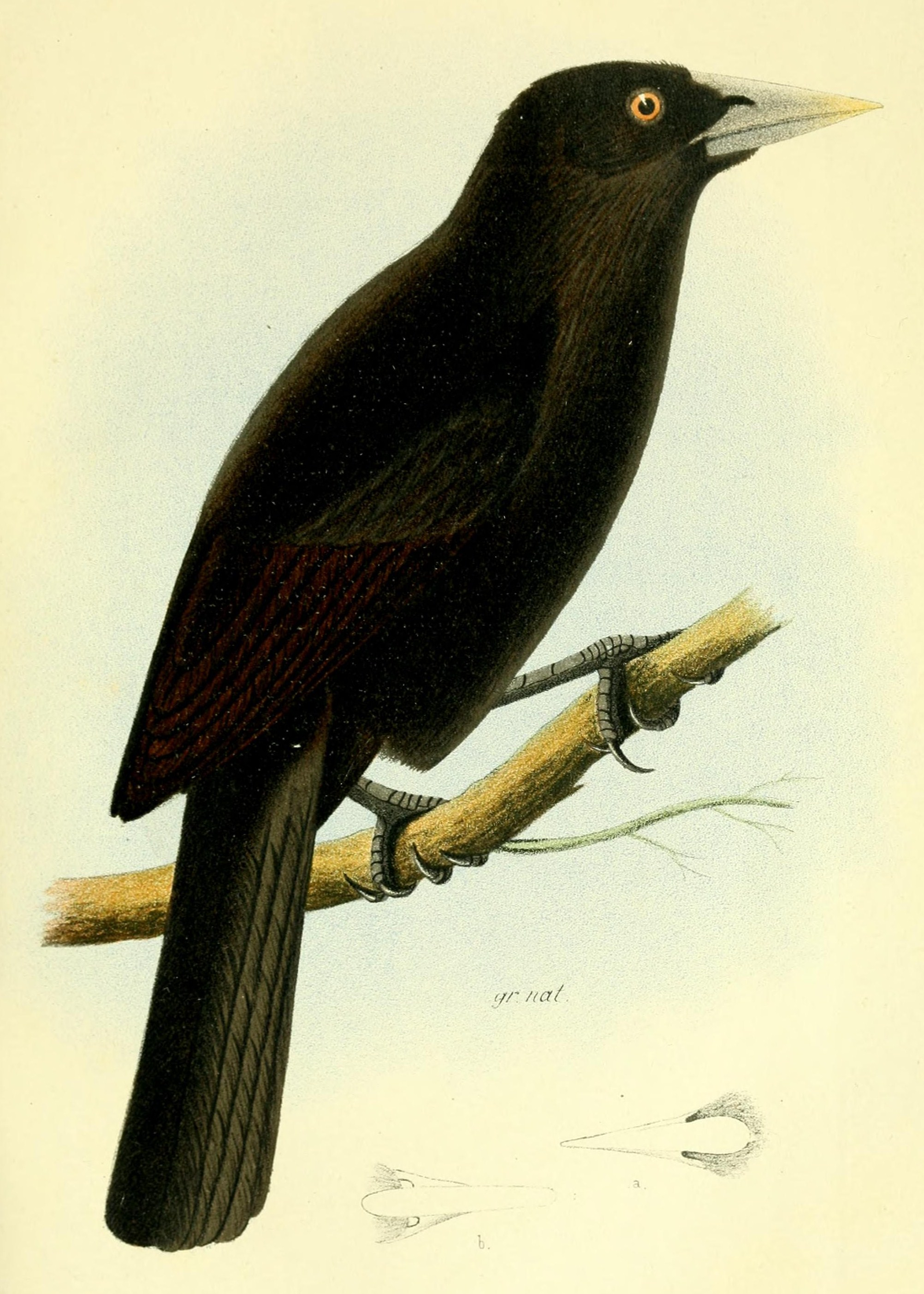

Conservation status
- Least Concern (IUCN 3.1)

Scientific classification
- Kingdom: Animalia
- Phylum: Chordata
- Class: Aves
- Order: Passeriformes
- Family: Icteridae
- Genus: Cacicus
- Species: C. sclateri

Binomial name
- Cacicus sclateri (Dubois, 1887)
- Range of Cacicus sclateri

= Ecuadorian cacique =

Species of bird

The Ecuadorian cacique (Cacicus sclateri) is a species of bird in the family Icteridae. It is found in Colombia, Ecuador, and Peru, where its natural habitat is subtropical or tropical moist lowland forest. A fairly common bird with a wide range, the IUCN has rated it a "species of least concern".

== Description ==
The male Ecuadorian cacique grows to a length of about 23 cm (9 in), with the female being a little smaller. The plumage of both sexes is entirely black, the beak is whitish, long and pointed, and the iris is blue in adults and brown in juveniles. This bird can be distinguished from the otherwise similar solitary cacique (Cacicus solitarius) because that species is larger, has a darker-coloured iris and spends more time in undergrowth and near the ground and less time in trees. Also similar is the red-rumped cacique (C. haemorrhous), but it reveals its bright red rump patch when in flight.

This bird has a number of noisy calls, including a repeated "péach-yo" and "péach-yo-yo", uttered while perched with raised tail, a "k-cheeyow?", and a "kweeyh-kweeyh-kweeyh-kweeyh-wonhh?" among others.

== Distribution and habitat ==
The species is native to southern Colombia, eastern Ecuador and northeastern Peru. It typically lives in moist woodland and the edges of riverside and Várzea forests, at altitudes of up to 400 m (1,300 ft).

== Ecology ==
An arboreal bird, the Ecuadorian cacique usually feeds alone but sometimes pairs of birds or small family groups move together through the tree canopy. It often visits flowering and fruiting trees and can sometimes be seen probing the petioles of Cecropia trees. Its diet is mainly insects such as ants, beetles and caterpillars, as well as fruit and possibly nectar.

== Status ==
C. sclateri has a small range, its area of occupancy being estimated as 294,000 km^{2} (113,514 sq mi). The tropical forests in which it lives are being degraded, reducing the area of suitable habitat, however it is a fairly common species, and the rate of any decline in total population is likely to be slow, so the International Union for Conservation of Nature has assessed its conservation status as "least concern".
