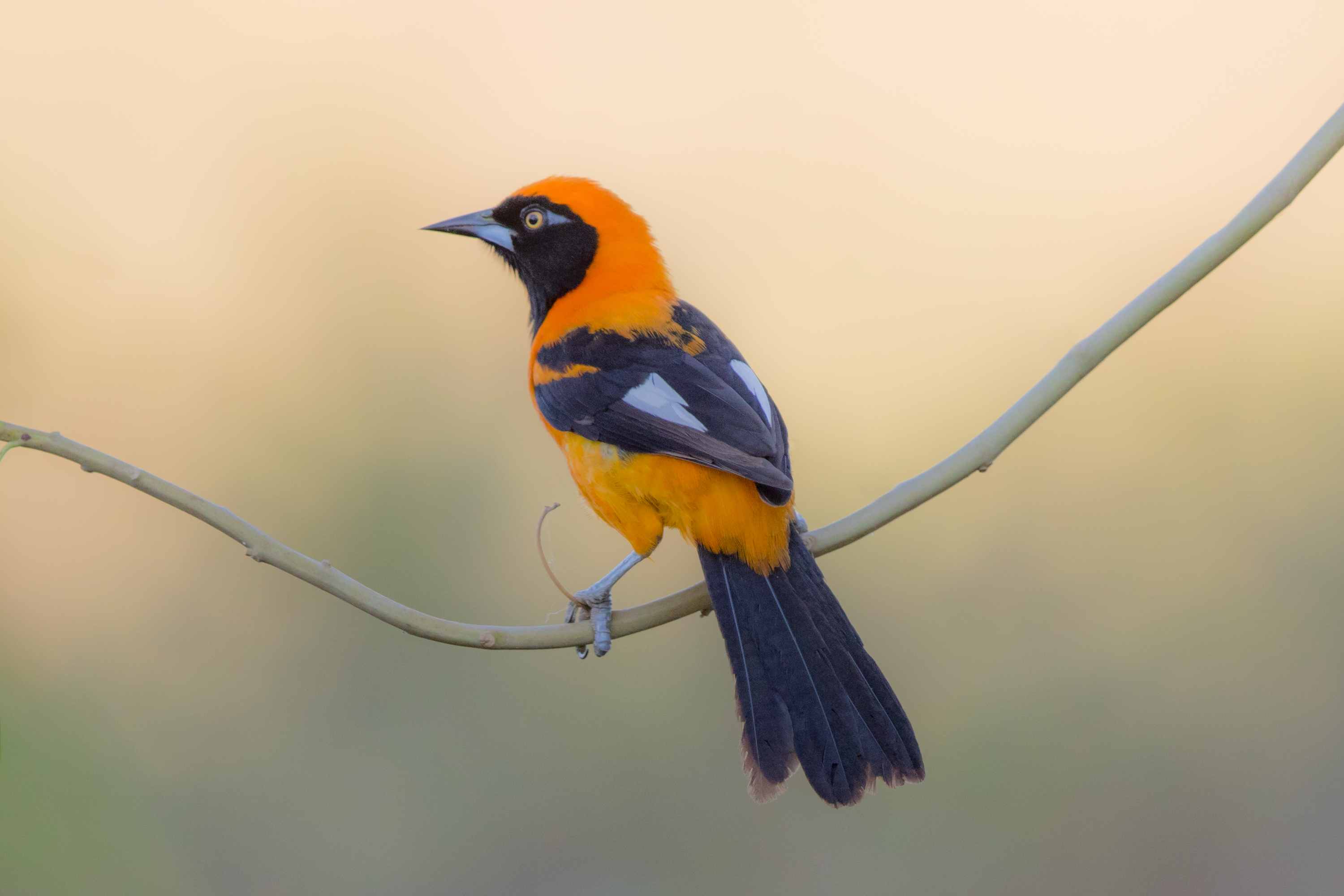
- I. croconotus in the Pantanal

Conservation status
- Least Concern (IUCN 3.1)

Scientific classification
- Kingdom: Animalia
- Phylum: Chordata
- Class: Aves
- Order: Passeriformes
- Family: Icteridae
- Genus: Icterus
- Species: I. croconotus

Binomial name
- Icterus croconotus (Wagler, 1829)
- Range of I. croconotus

= Orange-backed troupial =

Species of bird

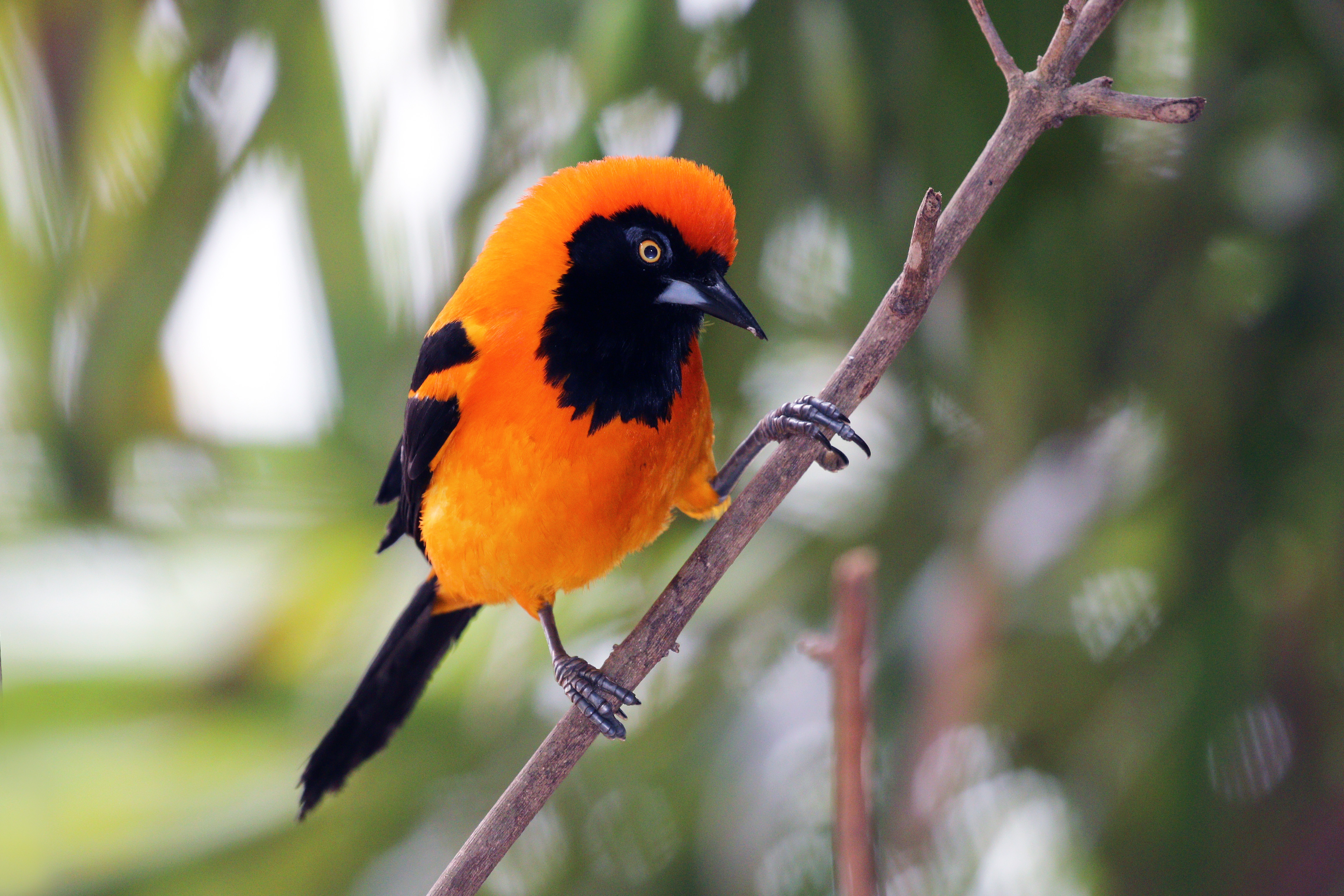
In the Pantanal

The orange-backed troupial (Icterus croconotus) is a species of bird in the family Icteridae. It is found in Guyana, Brazil, Paraguay, and eastern Ecuador, Bolivia, and Peru. It is closely related to the Venezuelan troupial (Icterus icterus) and Campo troupial (Icterus jamacaii), and at one time, all three were considered to be the same species.

== Name ==
The term troupial is from French troupiale, from troupe ("troop"), so named because they live in flocks. The Latin name icterus is from Greek ἴκτερος (íkteros, "jaundice"); the icterus was a bird the sight of which was believed to cure jaundice, perhaps the Eurasian golden oriole. It also had the more general meaning "yellow bird", which is why the name was later given to this South American bird. The specific name croconotus literally means "saffron back." (Latin crocus, "saffron," and Ancient Greek νῶτον, nôton, "back".)

== Description ==
The orange-backed troupial grows to a length of about 23 cm (9 in). In colour it is bright orange apart from a black face, bib, wings and tail, and a small white patch on the secondary wing feathers. It has an orange streak on its shoulder and a small blue ring of bare skin surrounds the eye. The bib has a neat lower edge which helps to distinguish it from the Venezuelan troupial, which has a shaggy base to the bib and a much larger white streak on the wing. The song consists of a number of loud, musical phrases, mostly with two syllables.

== Distribution and habitat ==
The orange-backed troupial is found in tropical South America east of the Andes where it is a non-migratory species. Its range extends from southern Guyana, southern Colombia and eastern Ecuador and Peru, through eastern and central Brazil to Bolivia and northern Paraguay. It inhabits forest edges, clearings, riparian woodland, secondary forest, and scrubby woodland at altitudes up to about 750 m (2,500 ft).

== Ecology ==
The orange-backed troupial often forages in pairs, feeding on fruits, insects and other arthropods found at all levels in the canopy. It also sips nectar from wild flowers, including Erythrina. It breeds in July and August in Colombia, and between November and March in Bolivia and Paraguay. It tends not to build its own nest but often pirates the nest of a yellow-rumped cacique (Cacicus cela).

== Status ==
This bird has a very large range amounting to over 6,000,000 square kilometres (2,300,000 sq mi) and is common in some places but less common elsewhere. The population trend is thought to be downward because of deforestation in the Amazon rainforest, but not at such a rate as to threaten its survival, and the International Union for Conservation of Nature has rated its conservation status as being of "least concern".
