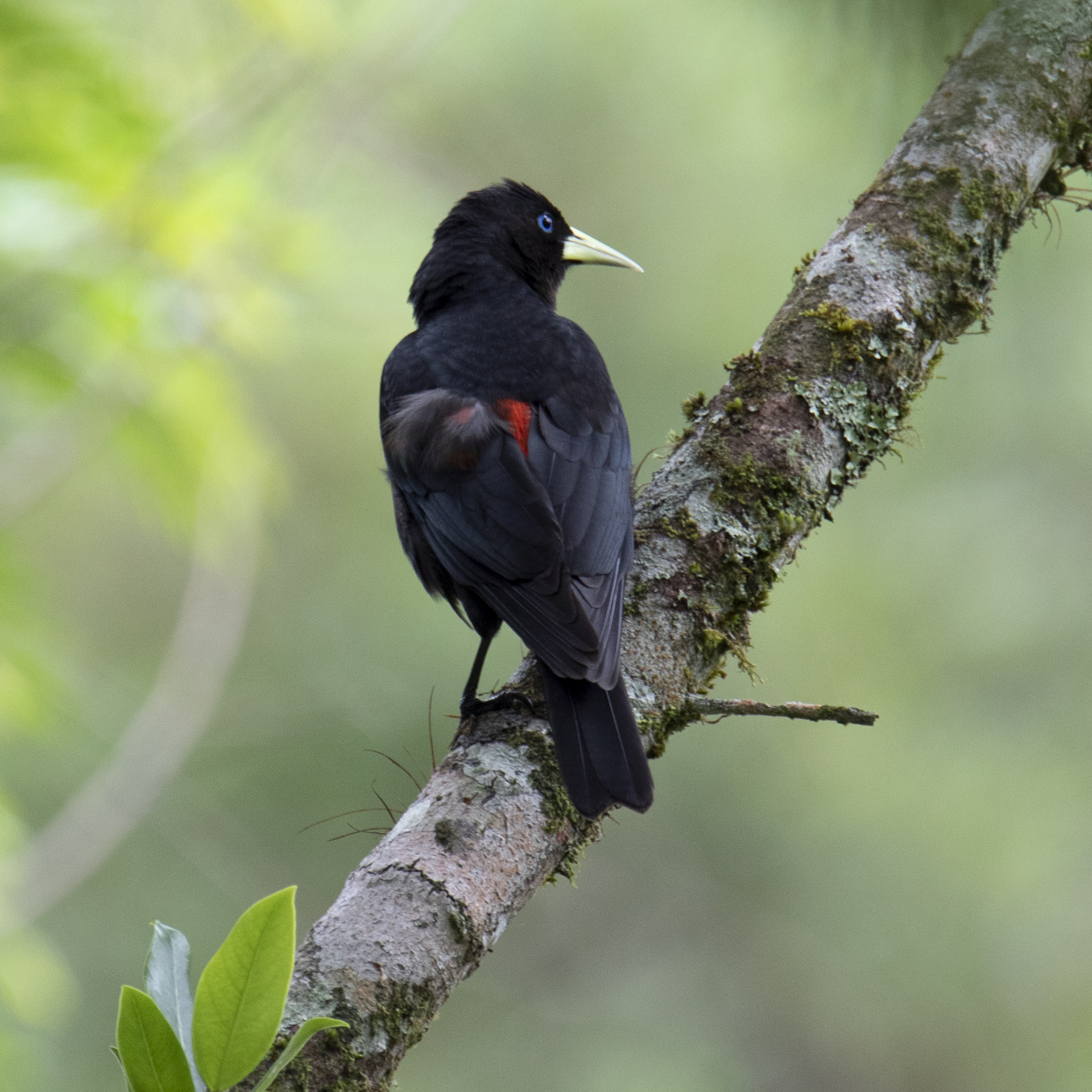

Conservation status
- Least Concern (IUCN 3.1)

Scientific classification
- Kingdom: Animalia
- Phylum: Chordata
- Class: Aves
- Order: Passeriformes
- Family: Icteridae
- Genus: Cacicus
- Species: C. haemorrhous

Binomial name
- Cacicus haemorrhous (Linnaeus, 1766)

Synonyms
- See text

= Red-rumped cacique =

Species of bird

The red-rumped cacique (Cacicus haemorrhous) is a species of bird in the family Icteridae, the oropendolas, New World orioles, and New World blackbirds. It is found in every mainland South American country except Chile.

== Taxonomy and systematics ==
In 1760 the French zoologist Mathurin Jacques Brisson included a description of the red-rumped cacique in his Ornithologie based on a specimen collected in Cayenne in French Guiana. He used the French name Le cassique rouge and the Latin name Cassicus ruber. Although Brisson coined Latin names, these do not conform to the binomial system and are not recognized by the International Commission on Zoological Nomenclature. When in 1766 the Swedish naturalist Carl Linnaeus updated his Systema Naturae for the twelfth edition, he added 240 species that had been previously described by Brisson. One of these was the red-rumped cacique. Linnaeus included a brief description, coined the binomial Oriolus haemorrhous and cited Brisson's work. The specific epithet haemorrhous combines the Ancient Greek words haima "blood" and orrhos "rump". The red-rumped cacique is now the type species in the genus Cacicus that was introduced by the French naturalist Bernard Germain de Lacépède in 1799.

The red-rumped cacique's further taxonomy is unresolved. The IOC, AviList, and BirdLife International's Handbook of the Birds of the World assign it these three subspecies:

- C. h. haemorrhous (Linnaeus, 1766)
- C. h. pachyrhynchus Berlepsch, 1889
- C. h. affinis Swainson, 1834

However, as of late 2025 the Clements taxonomy does not recognize C. h. pachyrhynchus but includes it within C. h. haemorrhous.

This article follows the three-subspecies model.

== Description ==
Male red-rumped caciques average 29 cm (11 in) long and 96.5 g (3.4 oz). Females average 25 cm (9.8 in) long and weigh 62 to 74 g (2.2 to 2.6 oz). The sexes have essentially the same plumage though females are overall duller than males. Adults of the nominate subspecies C. h. haemorrhous are mostly glossy black with a bright red lower back and rump. Males have a pale blue iris and females a brownish blue iris. Both sexes have an ivory-colored bill and black legs and feet. Juveniles resemble adult females. Subspecies C. h. pachyrhynchus has plumage like the nominate's but a thicker bill than the other two subspecies. C. h. affinis has less glossy black and paler red plumage than the nominate and the thinnest bill of the three subspecies.

== Distribution and habitat ==
The red-rumped cacique has a disjunct distribution. The ranges of C. h. haemorrhous and C. h. pachyrhynchus are contiguous but that of C. h. affinis is separate from theirs. Subspecies C. h. haemorrhous has the most northerly range. It is found in the northern Amazon Basin from the southeastern third of Colombia east through southern Venezuela and the Guianas to the Atlantic in northeastern Brazil. Its range continues south intermittently in eastern Ecuador into northern Peru and northern Amazonian Brazil. Subspecies C. h. pachyrhynchus is found from southeastern Peru and northern Bolivia east across southern Amazonian Brazil. Its southern edge in Brazil is a line roughly from western Mato Grosso northeast to the Atlantic in eastern Pará. Where these two subspecies meet or overlap is not clearly defined. Subspecies C. h. affinis is found in Brazil from a line roughly traced by Pernambuco, northern Minas Gerais, southern Tocantins, and west-central Mato Grosso do Sul south to Santa Catarina. According to most sources its range continues through eastern Paraguay into northeastern Argentina to Corrientes Province but excludes Uruguay. However, the South American Classification Committee has documented records in Uruguay.

The two Amazonian subspecies of the red-rumped cacique inhabit both primary and secondary forests. They are found primarily on the forest's edges and in clearings. They also occur in plantations within forest and in gallery forest. Subspecies C. h. affinis inhabits gallery forest and large forest and woodland stands; it also breeds in small towns and suburbs. In elevation the species is found below 500 m (1,600 ft) in Colombia, 900 m (3,000 ft) in Venezuela, 300 m (1,000 ft) in Ecuador, and 1,000 m (3,300 ft) in Peru and Brazil.

== Behavior ==
=== Movement ===
The red-rumped cacique is believed to be a sedentary year-round resident.

=== Feeding ===
The red-rumped cacique feeds on insects, other arthropodss, small vertebrates, fruits, and nectar. It forages mostly in trees but also in vines and epiphytes. It forages in flocks that in the non-breeding season may number more than 80 individuals.

=== Breeding ===
The red-rumped cacique's breeding season has not been fully defined but spans September to May in Suriname and August to January in Argentina. It breeds in colonies that in Amazonia typically number 20 to 30 nests and can reach 85 and 100 in southern Brazil and Argentina respectively. Colonies may include other icterids, and some colonies have had becards nest in the same trees. Females build the nest, a long bag or purse with an entrance slit near its top, woven from plant fibers and lined with leaves. They are hung from a tree branch or a palm frond; often the colony's tree or trees are somewhat isolated. The clutch is two eggs that are whitish with reddish brown markings. Females alone incubate, for about 17 to 18 days. Fledging occurs 23 to 28 days after hatch. Both parents provision nestlings but most is done by the female. Nests are sometimes taken over by piratic flycatchers (Legatus heucophaius) and are parasitized by giant cowbirds (Molothrus oryzivorus).

=== Vocalization ===
The red-rumped cacique has a "[l]oud, complex and varied repertoire of songs and calls, particularly among males". They have been described as an "unstructured series of high, hoarse sreek sreek... notes (not unlike barking of [a] small dog)." When alarmed all the members of a colony give "a loud harsh kak-kak-kak.

== Status ==
The IUCN has assessed the red-rumped cacique as being of Least Concern. It has an extremely large range; its population size is not known and is believed to be decreasing. No immediate threats have been identified. It is considered "uncommon and erratic" in Colombia, "everywhere somewhat local" in Venezuela, "very rare" in Ecuador, "uncommon [and] local" in Peru, "frequent to uncommon" in Amazonian Brazil, and "common to frequent" in southeastern Brazil. It is found in many national parks and other protected areas.
