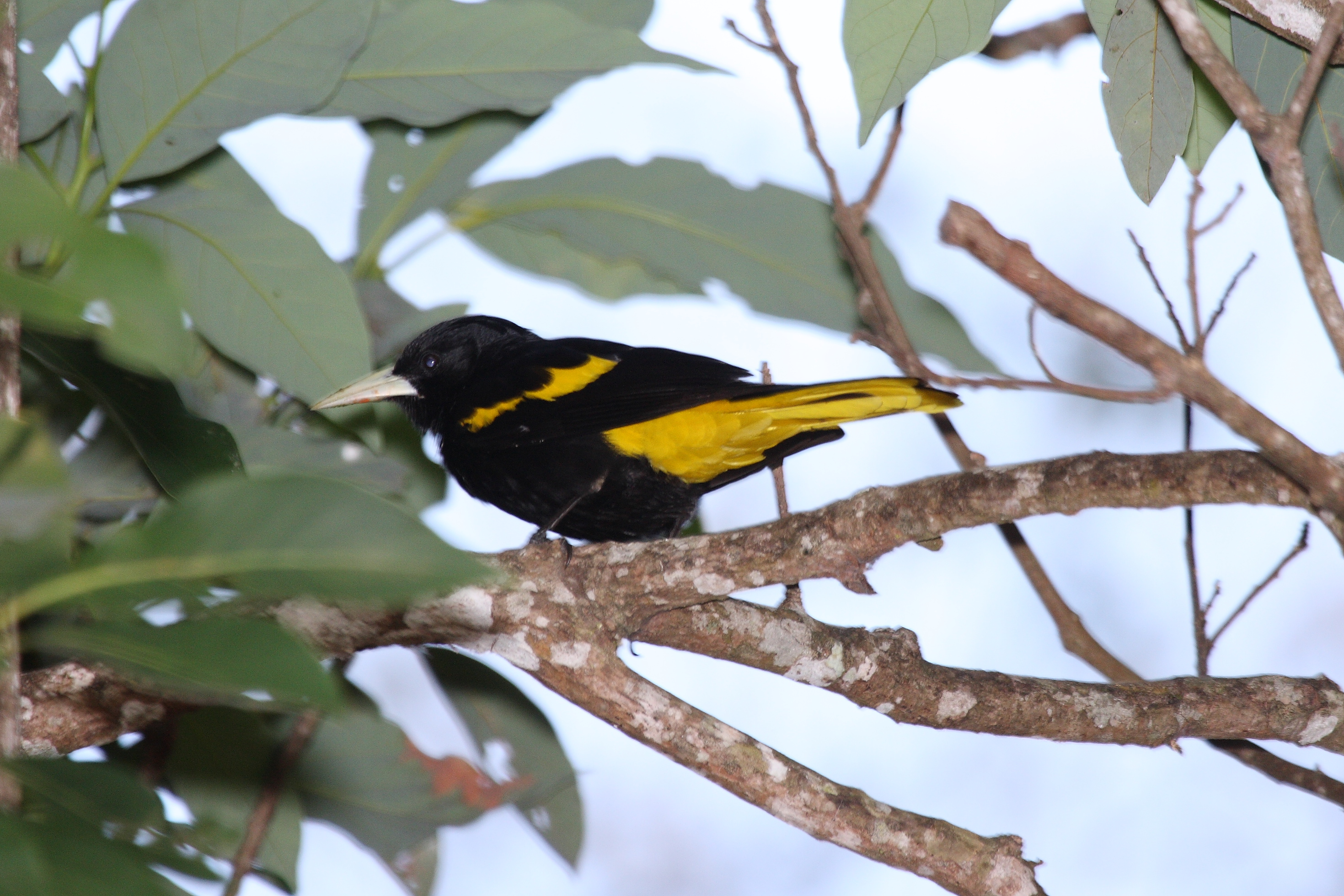

Conservation status
- Least Concern (IUCN 3.1)

Scientific classification
- Kingdom: Animalia
- Phylum: Chordata
- Class: Aves
- Order: Passeriformes
- Family: Icteridae
- Genus: Cassiculus; Swainson, 1827
- Species: C. melanicterus

Binomial name
- Cassiculus melanicterus (Bonaparte, 1825)

Synonyms
- see text

= Mexican cacique =

Species of bird

The Mexican cacique or yellow-winged cacique (Cassiculus melanicterus) is a species of bird in the family Icteridae, which includes the oropendolas, New World orioles, and New World blackbirds. It is found in El Salvador, Guatemala, and Mexico.

== Taxonomy and systematics ==
The Mexican cacique was formally described in 1825 with the binomial Icterus malanicterus, placing it among the New World orioles. The English ornithologist William Swainson erected genus Cassiculus in 1827 for what he believed was a new species. It was later determined that it was the same species as Icterus malanicterus, and because the species is not an oriole it gained its current generic name but retained its original specific epithet. During much of the twentieth century and into the twenty-first genus Cassiculus was merged into Cacicus but DNA studies returned the species to Cassiculus in the 2010s.

The Mexican cacique is the only member of its genus and has no subspecies.

== Description ==
Mexican cacique males average about 32 cm (13 in) long and females about 28 cm (11 in). Males weigh an average of about 96 g (3.4 oz) and females 70 g (2.5 oz). Adult males are mostly glossy black and have a long crest on the nape. Their lower back and uppertail coverts, most upperwing coverts, and crissum are yellow. Their tail is mostly black with yellow outer feathers. Adult females have a shorter crest than males. They have almost the same pattern as males but are a duller slaty black and their yellow tail feathers have olive edges. Both sexes have a dark brown iris, an ivory-colored bill with variable darker tinges, and dark gray legs and feet. Juveniles have no crest, are dusky where the adults are black, and have a greenish tinge on the yellow parts.

== Distribution and habitat ==
The Mexican cacique has a disjunct distribution. Its main range is along the Pacific lowlands of Mexico from central Sonora to western Chiapas. Many systems place it separately in western Guatemala. A 2016 field guide to northern Central American birds places it very locally in Guatemala and includes a sub-population in northern El Salvador. The Cornell Lab of Ornithology's Birds of the World also places it in El Salvador. In most of its range it inhabits clearings and edges of dry to moderately humid deciduous forest, thorn scrub, grassy areas such as savanna and large pastures if they have large trees, and also plantations. In El Salvador it primarily occurs in coastal mangroves and gallery forest. Overall it ranges from sea level to 1,500 m (4,900 ft) but reaches only about 200 m (700 ft) in Guatemala and El Salvador.

== Behavior ==
=== Movement ===
As best as is known the Mexican cacique is a sedentary year-round resident.

=== Feeding ===
The Mexican cacique feeds primarily on insects and other invertebrates and also on fruits and nectar in lesser amounts. It is thought to also prey on small vertebrates. It sometimes joins mixed-species feeding flocks. It forages in small flocks mostly from the forest's mid-level to its canopy.

=== Breeding ===
The Mexican cacique nests between April and August. It sometimes nests singly but often in small colonies in a single or multiple trees. Males make a courtship display by raising their crest and tail and spreading their wings. The species' nest is a bag or purse with an open top woven from plant fibers. It is usually suspended from a branch in a tall tree but nests have been noted hanging from utility wires. Many nests in rural areas are near houses. The clutch is two to four eggs that are pale blue with gray and black spots and streaks. The incubation period and time to fledging are not known. At least in El Salvador, both parents provision nestlings. The bronzed cowbird (Molothrus aeneus) is a frequent brood parasite.

=== Vocalization ===
The Mexican cacique's song is variable; a common version has been written "krrow-krrow-kshárá-chee". Its calls are also variable and include "harsh electric chatters, bell-like screams, and clear whistles".

== Status ==
The IUCN has assessed the Mexican cacique as being of Least Concern. It has a large range; its estimated population of at least 50,000 mature individuals is believed to be decreasing. No immediate threats have been identified. It is common to fairly common in most of Mexico but rare in the northern part of its range. It is "uncommon and very local" in Guatemala and El Salvador where it is a relatively recent arrival. It is taken as a cage bird in Mexico but the trade is regulated with quotas. It occurs in several protected areas in that country.
