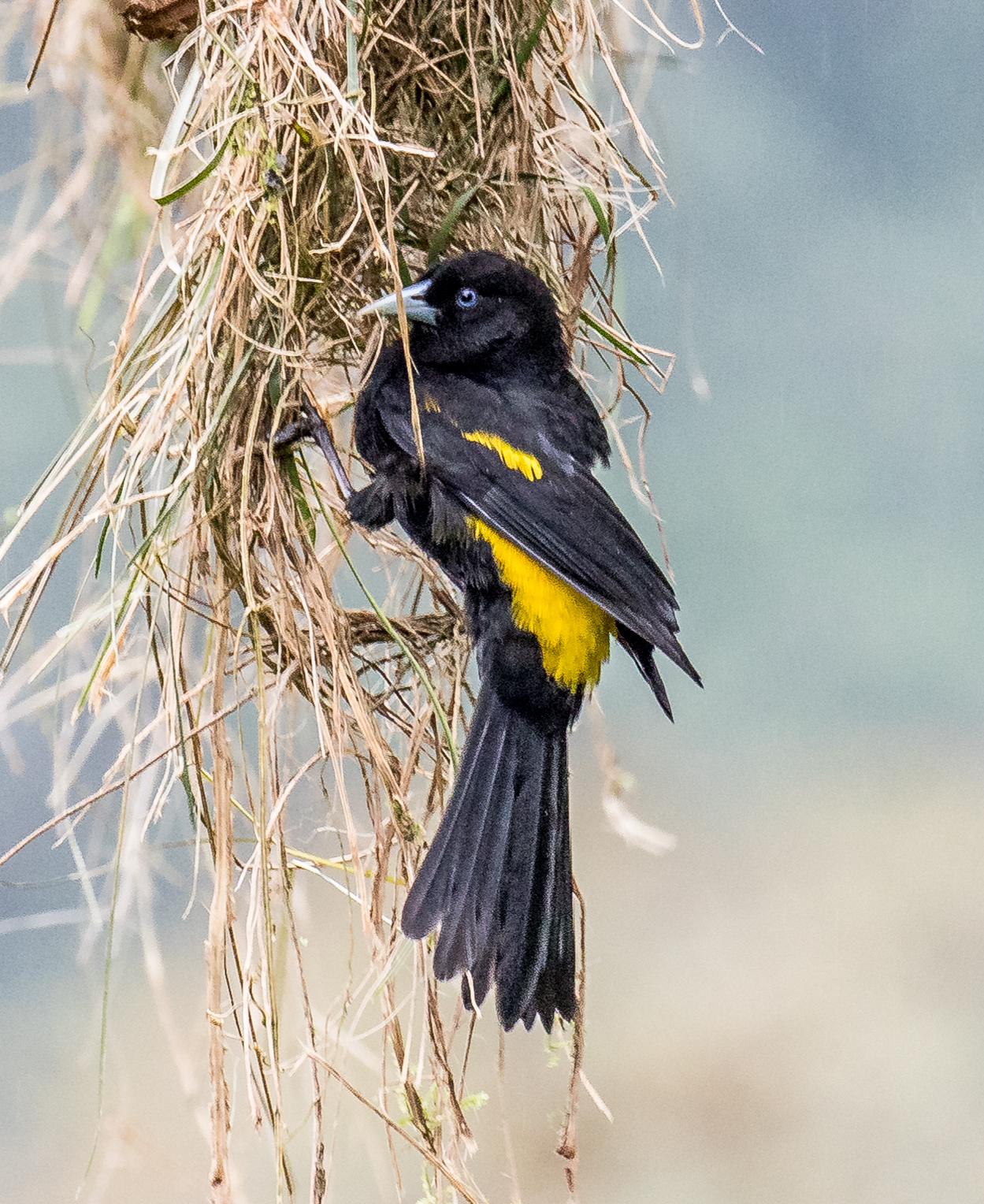
- C. c. leucoramphus in Papallacta, Ecuador

Conservation status
- Least Concern (IUCN 3.1)

Scientific classification
- Kingdom: Animalia
- Phylum: Chordata
- Class: Aves
- Order: Passeriformes
- Family: Icteridae
- Genus: Cacicus
- Species: C. chrysonotus

Binomial name
- Cacicus chrysonotus d'Orbigny & Lafresnaye, 1838
- Distribution map of mountain cacique. Green: C. c. leucoramphus and C. c. peruvianus; red: C. c. chrysonotus

Synonyms
- See text

Audio
- Call of C. c. leucoramphus

= Mountain cacique =

Species of bird

The mountain cacique (Cacicus chrysonotus) is a species of bird in the family Icteridae, the oropendolas, New World orioles, and New World blackbirds. It is found in Bolivia, Colombia, Ecuador, Peru, and Venezuela.

== Taxonomy and systematics ==
The mountain cacique has a complicated taxonomic history. It was formally described in 1838 with the binomial Cacicus Chrysonotus [sic]. In the first half of the twentieth century many authors placed it in genus Archiplanus which was later merged into Cacicus.

As of late 2025 taxonomic systems assign the mountain cacique these three subspecies:

- C. c. leucoramphus (Bonaparte, 1845)
- C. c. peruvianus Zimmer, JT, 1924
- C. c. chrysonotus d'Orbigny & Lafresnaye, 1838

However, in the second half of the twentieth century and well into the twenty-first many authors treated chrysonotus as a species, the "southern mountain cacique" and the other two as the "northern mountain cacique". The IOC and BirdLife International's Handbook of the Birds of the World kept them separate until 2023. The Clements taxonomy recognizes some distinction within the species, calling C. c. chrysonotus the "mountain cacique (Bolivian)" and grouping the other two subspecies as the "mountain cacique (golden-shouldered)". "A formal analysis of vocal differences, including assessment of homologous vocalizations and analysis of intraspecific variation, and assessment of gene flow across contact zones is needed."

== Description ==
Mountain caciques are about 25 to 30 cm (9.8 to 12 in) long. Males weigh about 92 to 98 g (3.2 to 3.5 oz) and females about 64 to 67 g (2.3 to 2.4 oz). The sexes have essentially the same plumage though females are a duller black than males. Adults are almost entirely glossy black. Their lower back and rump are yellow, and some individuals have some to much yellow on the upperwing coverts. They have a blue to bluish white iris, a pale yellow-ivory to greenish ivory bill with a bluish gray base, and black legs and feet. Juveniles have dark brown eyes but are otherwise like adults.

== Distribution and habitat ==
The mountain cacique has a disjunct distribution. Subspecies C. c. leucoramphus is separate from the others and has gaps within its overall range. The other two subspecies' ranges are contiguous or nearly so. Subspecies C. c. leucoramphus is the northernmost. It is found from western Venezuela's extreme southern Táchira south intermittently through all three ranges of the Colombian Andes and essentially continuously along the eastern Andean slope of Ecuador into extreme northern Peru's Piura Department. Subspecies C. c. peruvianus is found in Peru from Amazonas Department south on the eastern Andean slope to Junín Department. C. c. chrysonotus is found from Junín south into central Bolivia.

The mountain cacique inhabits humid montane forest in the subtropical to temperate zones. In elevation it ranges between 1,900 and 2,800 m (6,200 and 9,200 ft) in Venezuela, between 1,700 and 3,500 m (5,600 and 11,500 ft) in Colombia, mostly between 2,000 and 3,100 m (6,600 and 10,200 ft) in Ecuador, and between 1,800 and 3,450 m (5,900 and 11,300 ft) in Peru.

== Behavior ==
=== Movement ===
The mountain cacique is not a conventional migrant but some elevational movements are suspected.

=== Feeding ===
The mountain cacique's diet is not known in detail but appears to be mostly insects and other arthropods with some nectar and fruits. It feeds mostly in trees and typically finds prey by probing bark and epiphytes. It forages singly, in pairs, and in small flocks and often joins mixed-species feeding flocks.

=== Breeding ===
The mountain cacique's breeding season has not been fully defined but spans February to July in Colombia and at least October to January in Bolivia. It nests solitarily or in small colonies. Its nest is a bag or purse with a top entrance, made from plant fibers, and hung from a branch. Nothing else is known about the species' breeding biology.

=== Vocalization ===
The song of the male mountain cacique is described as "pig-like squeals followed by high-pitched notes and accelerating into a rattle". It is "quite vocal, with a variety of loud calls including a wree-wree-wree-wreeuh, sometimes just a single wree! or kreeuh!, and a repeated more nasal skeeuh".

== Status ==
The IUCN has assessed the mountain cacique as being of Least Concern. It has a very large range; its population size is not known and is believed to be decreasing. No immediate threats have been identified. It is considered fairly common in the southern part of its range but less so in the far north. It occurs in two national parks in Bolivia.
