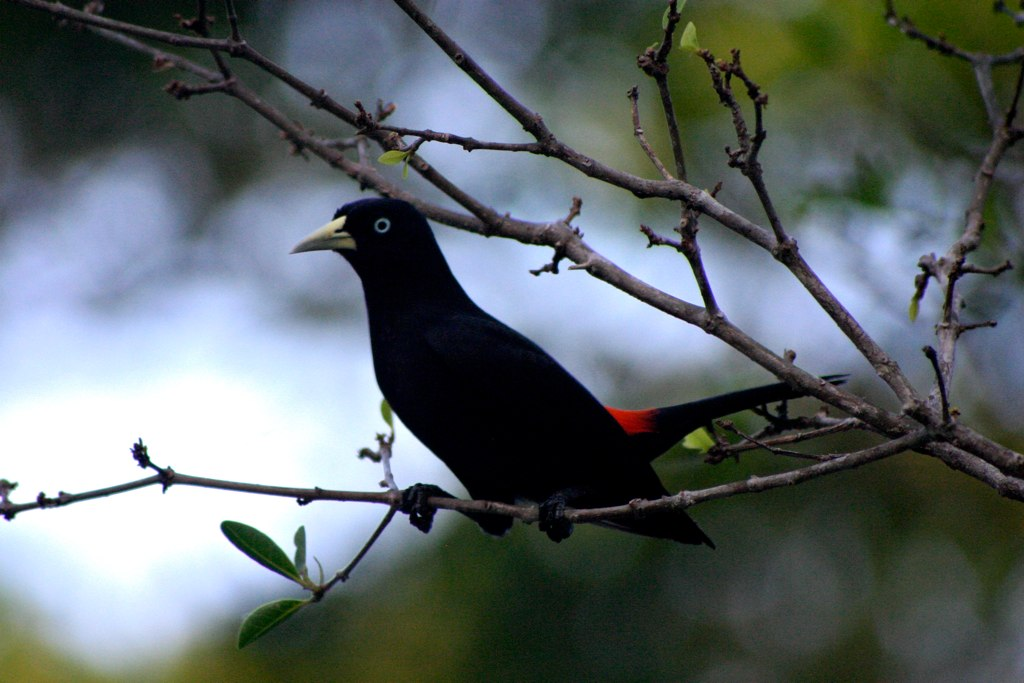
- In Panama

Conservation status
- Least Concern (IUCN 3.1)

Scientific classification
- Kingdom: Animalia
- Phylum: Chordata
- Class: Aves
- Order: Passeriformes
- Family: Icteridae
- Genus: Cacicus
- Species: C. uropygialis

Binomial name
- Cacicus uropygialis Lafresnaye, 1843

Audio
- Song

= Scarlet-rumped cacique =

Species of bird

The scarlet-rumped cacique (Cacicus uropygialis) is a passerine bird species in the New World blackbird family Icteridae. This species has sometimes been split into two species: the scarlet-rumped cacique (Cacicus microrhynchus) and the subtropical cacique (Cacicus uropygialis).

== Taxonomy ==
The scarlet-rumped cacique was formally described in 1843 by the French ornithologist Frédéric de Lafresnaye based on a specimen collected in Colombia. He coined the binomial name Cassicus uropygialis where the specific epithet is from Medieval Latin uropygium meaning "rump". The scarlet-rumped cacique is now one of ten species placed in the genus Cacicus that was introduced in 1799 by the French naturalist Bernard Germain de Lacépède.

Three subspecies are recognised:

- Cacicus uropygialis microrhynchus (Sclater, PL & Salvin, O, 1865) – far northeastern Honduras to eastern Panama (except Darién Province)
- Cacicus uropygialis pacificus Chapman, FM, 1915 – eastern Panama (Darién Province) to western Colombia and western Ecuador (El Oro)
- Cacicus uropygialis uropygialis Lafresnaye, 1843 – Andes of Colombia to northwestern Venezuela, eastern Ecuador, and southeastern Peru

The taxa C. u. pacificus and C. u. microrhynchus are sometimes treated as a separate species with the English name, the scarlet-rumped cacique. The nominate C. u. uropygialis is then known as the subtropical cacique.

== Description ==
The scarlet-rumped cacique is sexually dimorphic like many Icteridae, though it mainly concerns size in this species. Males are 23 cm (9 in) long and weigh 68 g (2.4 oz), while the female is 20 cm (8 in) long and weighs 53 g (1.9 oz); This cacique is a slim long-winged bird, with a relatively short tail, blue eyes, and a pale yellow pointed bill. It has mainly black plumage, apart from a scarlet patch on the lower back and upper rump. The female is smaller and a duller black than the male, and the juvenile bird has a brownish tone to the plumage and a brownish-orange rump.

The song of these birds is a pleasant wheee-whee-whee-whee-wheet, but the Pacific cacique has a descending melancholy wheeo-wheeo-wheeo-wheeo, while C. m. microrynchus in the narrowest sense has a burry pleeo; C. m. pacificus has a sweeter keeo or a shree.

== Behaviour ==
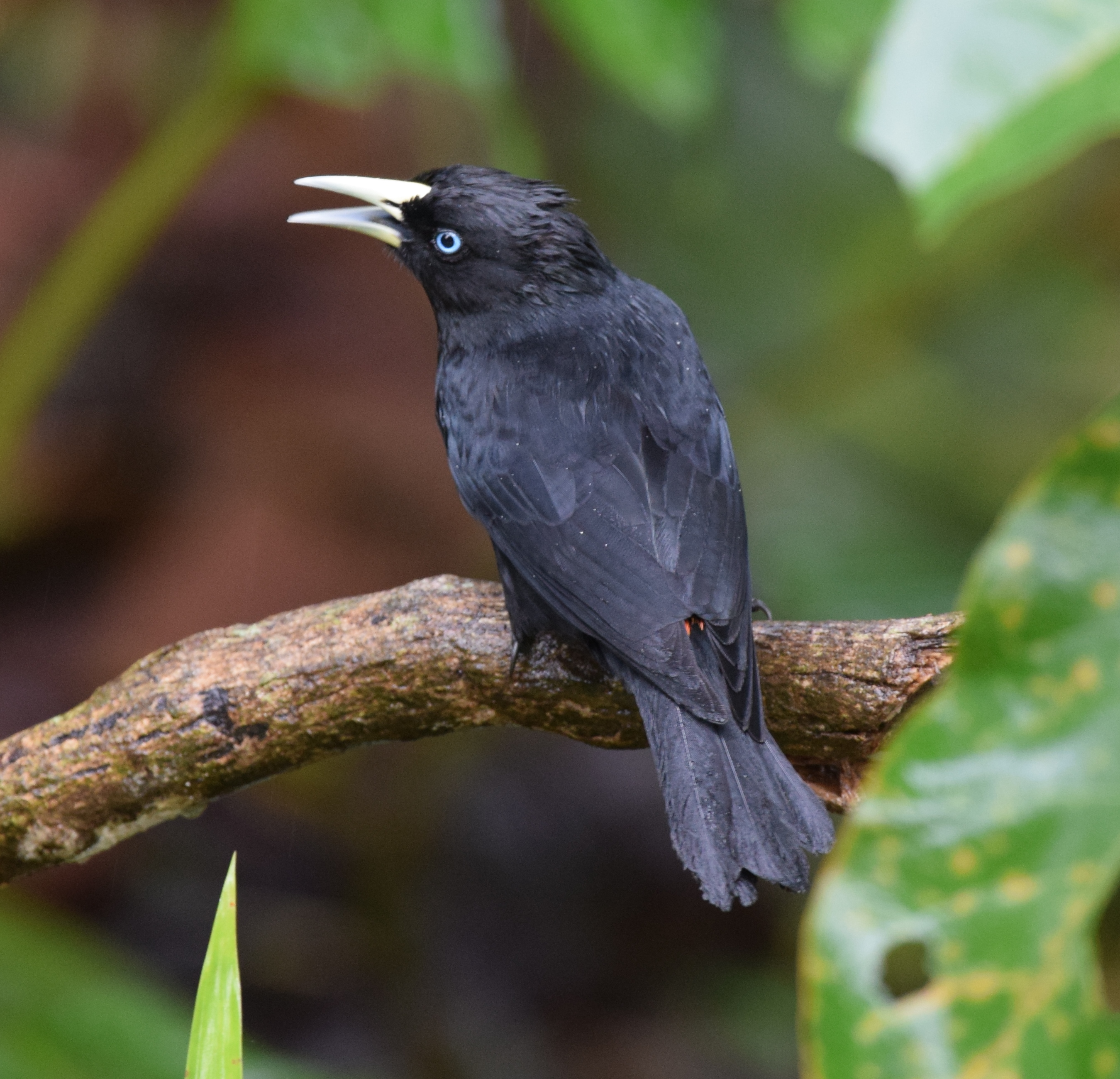
In Costa Rica

Unlike some other caciques they are not usually colonial breeders; like them they have a bag-shaped nest. It is built about 3.5–30 m (11–98 ft) above ground, in a tree which usually also contains an active wasp nest. The bird's nest is 36–64 cm (14–25 in) long, widens at the base, and is suspended from the end of a branch. The normal clutch is two dark-blotched white eggs. The male will assist in feeding the young, but does not incubate.
