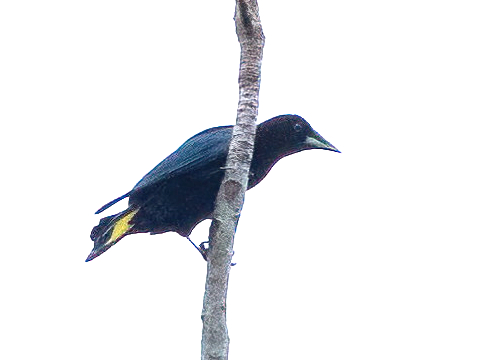

Conservation status
- Least Concern (IUCN 3.1)

Scientific classification
- Kingdom: Animalia
- Phylum: Chordata
- Class: Aves
- Order: Passeriformes
- Family: Icteridae
- Genus: Cacicus
- Species: C. latirostris

Binomial name
- Cacicus latirostris Swainson, 1838
- Year-Round range

Synonyms
- See text

= Band-tailed cacique =

Species of bird

The band-tailed cacique (Cacicus latirostris) is a species of bird in the family Icteridae, the oropendolas, New World orioles, and New World blackbirds. It is found in Brazil, Colombia, Ecuador, and Peru.

== Taxonomy and systematics ==
The band-tailed cacique has a complicated taxonomic history. It was formally described in 1838 with its current binomial Cacicus latirostris. Various twentieth century authors placed it in either genus Ocyalus or genus Psarocolius. By the twenty-first century Psarocolius was no longer used and in the 2010s Ocyalus was merged into Cacicus. During its time as Ocyalus latirostris it was called the "band-tailed oropendola".

The band-tailed cacique is monotypic.

== Description ==
Male band-tailed caciques average about 33 cm (13 in) long and 118 g (4.2 oz). Females average about 24.5 cm (9.6 in) long and 75 g (2.6 oz). The sexes have essentially the same plumage though females are a duller black than males. Adults are mostly velvety black. Their crown, nape, and upper back are chestnut and their wings have a bluish gloss. Their central tail feathers are black and the rest are yellow with black tips. They have a pale blue iris and black legs and feet. Their bill can be ivory-colored with a dusky wash on the tip or have a dusky gray maxilla and an ivory mandible.

== Distribution and habitat ==
The band-tailed cacique is a bird of the far western Amazon Basin. Its range includes extreme southern Amazonas Department in far southern Colombia and scattered locations in eastern Ecuador. In Peru it is found through most of Loreto and the northern half of Ucayali departments and slightly beyond their borders to the west. Its range continues east from Peru into the western parts of far western Brazil's Amazonas and Acre states.

The band-tailed cacique primarily inhabits várzea forest along rivers and islands in them. It has been reported in terra firme forest near rivers. In elevation it is found below about 100 m (300 ft) in Colombia and below about 300 m (1,000 ft) in Ecuador and Brazil.

== Behavior ==
=== Movement ===
The band-tailed cacique is believed to be a sedentary year-round resident.

=== Feeding ===
The band-tailed cacique's diet is known to include caterpillars and fruits and is assumed to also include other arthropods, small vertebrates, and nectar. It usually forages in small groups below the forest's canopy but has been noted in much greater numbers as members of mixed-species feeding flocks.

=== Breeding ===
The band-tailed cacique's breeding season includes August and September in most of its range. It breeds solitarily or in colonies of up to about 20 nests. Its nest is an open-topped bag or purse suspended from a tree branch. Nothing else is known about the species' breeding biology.

=== Vocalization ===
The band-tailed cacique's song is "a fairly short twanging ka'CHAWWW or CHOOO interspersed with higher rusty squeaks". Its calls are "rich, throaty g'luck, rhaw, and chaw notes".

== Status ==
The IUCN has assessed the band-tailed cacique as being of Least Concern. Its population size is not known and is believed to be decreasing. No immediate threats have been identified. It is considered "uncommon and erratic" in Colombia, "very rare" in Ecuador, "uncommon" in Peru, and "uncommon to rare" in Brazil. It occurs in a few protected areas.
