= Piratic flycatcher =

- Call recorded in Ecuador

Conservation status
- Least Concern (IUCN 3.1)

Scientific classification
- Kingdom: Animalia
- Phylum: Chordata
- Class: Aves
- Order: Passeriformes
- Family: Tyrannidae
- Genus: Legatus; P.L. Sclater, 1859
- Species: L. leucophaius

Binomial name
- Legatus leucophaius (Vieillot, 1818)
- Breeding Year-round

Species of bird

The piratic flycatcher (Legatus leucophaius) is a passerine bird in the family Tyrannidae, the tyrant flycatchers. It is found in Mexico, in every Central American country except El Salvador, in Trinidad and Tobago, and in every mainland South American country except Chile, though in Uruguay only as a vagrant. It has also occurred several times as a vagrant in the southern United States.

== Taxonomy and systematics ==
The piratic flycatcher was originally described in 1818 as Platyrhynchos leucophaius. It was later moved to its current genus Legatus that was erected in 1859. For a time it was also known as Legatus albicollis.

The piratic flycatcher is the only member of genus Legatus. It has two subspecies, the nominate L. l. leucophaius (Vieillot, 1818) and L. l. variegatus (Sclater, PL, 1857).

== Description ==
The piratic flycatcher is 14.5 to 17 cm (5.7 to 6.7 in) long and weighs 19 to 26 g (0.67 to 0.92 oz). The sexes and the subspecies have the same plumage though subspecies L. l. variegatus is significantly larger than the nominate. Adults have a blackish forehead and crown with a partially hidden yellow patch on the latter. They have a wide dull whitish supercilium that extends around the head under the crown; it has some faint grayish streaks toward the rear. They have dusky lores, ear coverts, and moustachial stripe and white cheeks. Their upperparts are mostly dark grayish brown or dark olive-brown with pale edges on most feathers. Their uppertail coverts have rusty or cinnamon edges. Their wings are brownish black with whitish edges on the coverts. Their primaries have very thin pale grayish brown edges and their secondaries have whitish edges. Their tail is dusky brown or blackish brown. The tail feathers' inner webs and sometimes the outer webs have lighter edges. Their chin and throat are unstreaked whitish. Their underparts are mostly yellowish white or pale yellow with wide brownish or olive streaks on the breast, sides, and flanks. Their short, wide, and stubby bill is mostly brownish black with a browner base to the mandible. They have a brown iris and dusky legs and feet. Juveniles have no yellow on the crown. They have light cinnamon tips on the crown feathers, a buffy supercilium, wide cinnamon edges on the wing coverts, rusty edges on the tail feathers, and paler underparts than adults with few or no streaks.

== Distribution and habitat ==
Subspecies L. l. variegatus is the more northerly of the two. It is found from San Luis Potosí in east-central Mexico south on the Gulf-Caribbean side of the country except for the eastern Yucatán Peninsula and south through Belize and northern and central Guatemala into northern and eastern Honduras. It also occurs on the Pacific slope in Mexico's Chiapas state. The nominate subspecies is found from Nicaragua south through Costa Rica and Panama into Colombia. In South America its range extends south through Colombia, western and eastern Ecuador, and eastern Peru. It extends east through Venezuela and the Guianas and from there south through Brazil to Mato Grosso and northern Rio Grande do Sul except for part of the country's northeast, through northern Bolivia and eastern Paraguay, and into northwestern Argentina to Tucumán Province and northeastern Argentina to Corrientes Province. It also occurs on both Trinidad and Tobago. Subspecies L. l. variegatus has occurred as a vagrant in New Mexico, Texas, and Florida. The nominate subspecies has occurred as a vagrant in Uruguay.

The piratic flycatcher inhabits a variety of somewhat open landscapes in the tropical and lower subtropical zones. These include secondary forest, gallery forest, humid woodland, the edges of evergreen forest, clearings with some trees within forest, and agricultural areas. In Mexico and Central America it mostly occurs from sea level to 1,000 m (3,300 ft) though is found locally to 1,500 m (4,900 ft). In Colombia it reaches 1,600 m (5,200 ft), in Ecuador 800 m (2,600 ft), in Peru 1,400 m (4,600 ft), in Venezuela 1,000 m (3,300 ft), and in Brazil 1,000 m (3,300 ft).

== Behavior ==
=== Movement ===
The piratic flycatcher is a partial migrant, though its movements are not known in detail. It almost entirely vacates Mexico and Central America from about late September into January though there are scattered records there throughout the winter. These migrants apparently winter in northern South America. The species is a year-round resident in most of South America though it appears to be present in far southern Brazil and in Argentina only in the austral summer of September to March.

=== Feeding ===
Adult piratic flycatchers feed primarily on fruit, especially small berries and on green Cecropia catkins, when it is available. At other times they feed on insects, especially dragonflies (Odonata). They forage singly or in pairs, perching high in the canopy on an exposed branch or dead snag and take insects in mid-air by hawking.

=== Breeding ===
The piratic flycatcher's breeding season has not been fully defined. It includes February to August in different parts of Venezuela and on Trinidad, August to December in Peru, and October to December in Argentina. It does not build its own nest, but pirates domed or pendant nests of other species. The most often affected are members of family Icteridae (such as caciques), Phacellodomus thornbirds, and other tyrant flycatchers. They take over the nest by harassing its builders and by removing eggs and sometimes nestlings. Its clutch is two to three eggs that are white with a rosy tinge and chestnut and gray markings. The incubation period is 16 days and females alone incubate. Fledging occurs 18 to 20 days after hatch. During the nestling period females brood the young and both parents provision them.

=== Vocalization ===
The piratic flycatcher is highly vocal during the breeding season, and usually vocalizes from a high perch. Its call has been variously described as wee-o-dee!, "a whining querulous weé-yee", and "a loud, high, rising-falling whistle: wseeEEEeee". It has a variety of other vocalizations including "de-di-di-di-di", a "rolled ji-ji-jit or persistent whee di-weet", and a "longer, sometimes prolonged series of emphatic, piping, rising and falling whii-whii-whii or pee-pee-pee whistles".

== Status ==
The IUCN has assessed the piratic flycatcher as being of Least Concern. It has an extremely large range; its estimated population of at least five million mature individuals is believed to be decreasing. No immediate threats have been identified. It is considered fairly common in northern Central America, common in Costa Rica and Colombia, fairly common in Peru, and locally fairly common in Venezuela. It is found "in many national parks and other protected areas throughout range".
