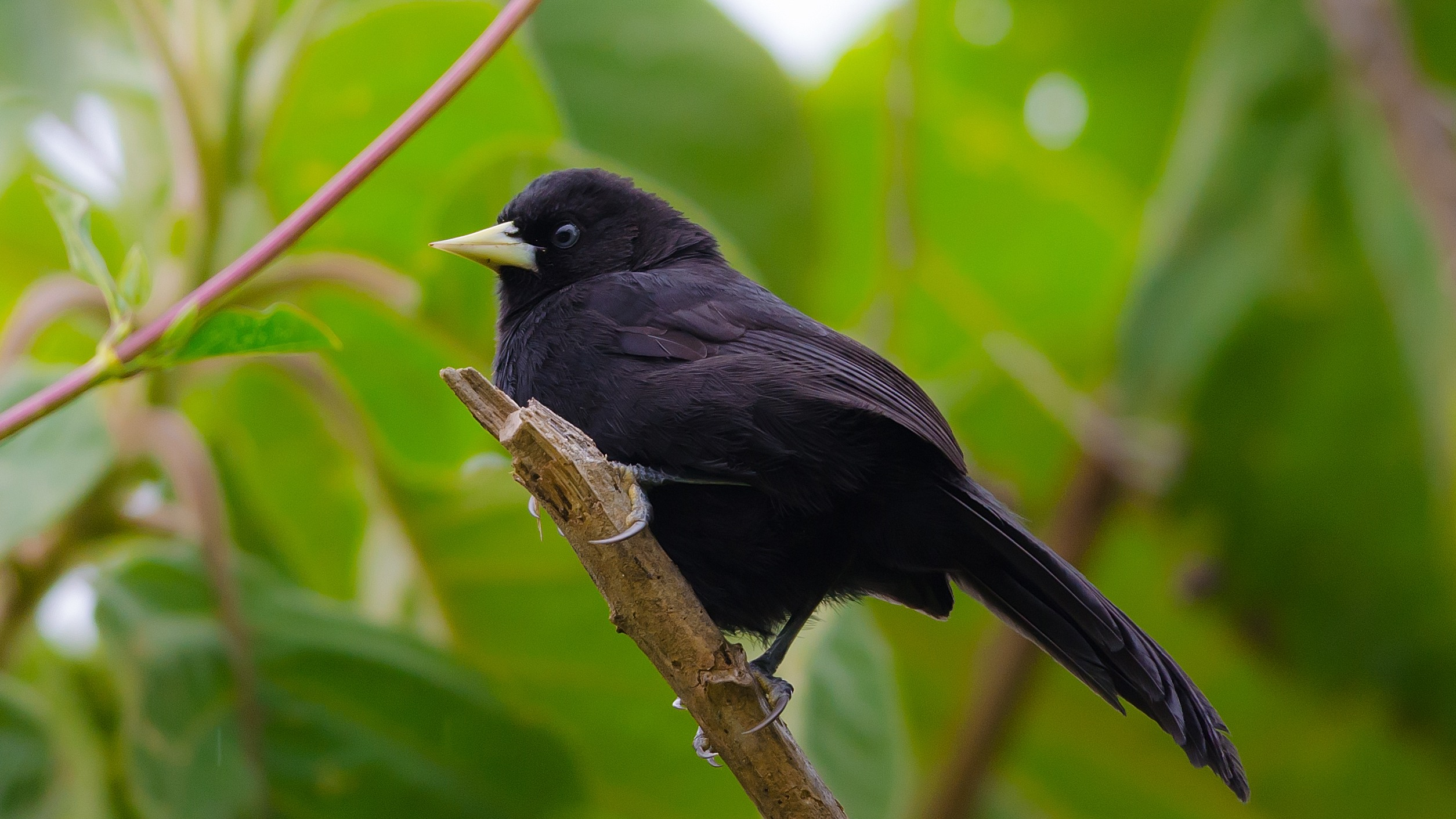

Conservation status
- Least Concern (IUCN 3.1)

Scientific classification
- Kingdom: Animalia
- Phylum: Chordata
- Class: Aves
- Order: Passeriformes
- Family: Icteridae
- Genus: Amblycercus; Cabanis, 1851
- Species: A. holosericeus

Binomial name
- Amblycercus holosericeus (Deppe, 1830)
- Range of Amblycercus holosericeus

Audio

= Yellow-billed cacique =

Species of bird

The yellow-billed cacique (Amblycercus holosericeus) is a species of bird in the family Icteridae. It is found in Mexico, every Central American country, Bolivia, Colombia, Ecuador, Peru, and Venezuela.

== Taxonomy and systematics ==
The yellow-billed cacique was formally described in 1830 with the binomial Sturnus holosericieus. In 1851 Jean Cabanis erected the genus Amblycercus with it as the type species. For part of the twentieth century it was assigned to genus Cacicus but by the end of the century had been firmly placed back in Amblycercus. It is basal to the oropendolas and caciques but is not closely related to any of them.

The yellow-billed cacique is the only member of its genus and has these three subspecies:

- Amblycercus holosericeus holosericeus (Deppe, 1830)
- Amblycercus holosericeus flavirostris Chapman, 1915
- Amblycercus holosericeus australis Chapman, 1919

Some authors have suggested that A. h. australis might warrant full species status. The Clements taxonomy draws some distinction within the species, calling A. h. australis the "yellow-billed cacique (Chapman's)" and grouping the other two subspecies as the "yellow-billed cacique (Prevost's)".

== Description ==
Yellow-billed cacique males are about 21.5 cm (8.5 in) and females about 20.5 cm (8.1 in) long. Males of subspecies A. h. holosericeus and A. h. flavirostris weigh an average of 69 g (2.4 oz) and females 53 g (1.9 oz). Males of subspecies A. h. australis weigh an average of 50 g (1.8 oz) and females 47 g (1.7 oz). Adult males of all three subspecies are entirely black and females are a slightly slaty black. Both sexes have a pale yellow iris and gray legs and feet. Juveniles are duller than adults and have a dark iris. All subspecies have a long bill whose tip is chisel-shaped. That of the nominate subspecies A. h. holosericeus is yellow, that of A. h. flavirostris is a brighter yellow, and that of A. h. australis is more slender than the others' and is yellow with a gray base.

== Distribution and habitat ==
The yellow-billed cacique has a disjunct distribution. The subspecies are found thus:

- Amblycercus holosericeus holosericeus: from southern Tamaulipas in eastern Mexico south along the Gulf of Mexico and through most of southern Mexico including the Yucatán Peninsula, through northern Central America and Nicaragua on both the Caribbean and Pacific slopes, through most of the width of Costa Rica and Panama, and into far northwestern Colombia
- Amblycercus holosericeus flavirostris: from Chocó Department in northwestern Colombia south along the Pacific slope through Ecuador into far northern Peru's Tumbes Department
- Amblycercus holosericeus australis: in the Venezuelan Coastal Range of Aragua and the Distrito Federal; in the Serranía del Perijá on the Venezuela-Colombia border; in the isolated Sierra Nevada de Santa Marta in northern Colombia; and in the Andes from Mérida in western Venezuela south intermittently through eastern Colombia, eastern Ecuador, and eastern Peru into Bolivia to western Santa Cruz Department

The yellow-billed cacique inhabits dense undergrowth, primarily at the edges of forest and also in clearings, in secondary forest, and in abandoned agricultural fields. In the Andes it greatly favors stands of Chusquea bamboo. In elevation it ranges between sea level and 2,150 m (7,100 ft) in northern Central America, between 1,800 and 2,000 m (5,900 and 6,600 ft) in the Venezuelan Coastal Range, and between 1,800 and 3,100 m (5,900 and 10,200 ft) in the Venezuelan Andes. It reaches 3,100 m (10,200 ft) in Costa Rica and Panama. In most of Colombia it is below 2,100 m (6,900 ft) but reaches 3,500 m (11,500 ft) in the Sierra Nevada de Santa Marta. It ranges from sea level to 1,700 m (5,600 ft) western Ecuador, between 1,900 and 3,100 m (6,200 and 10,200 ft) in eastern Ecuador, only to 750 m (2,500 ft) in Tumbes, Peru, and between 2,100 and 3,350 m (6,900 and 11,000 ft) in the Peruvian Andes.

== Behavior ==
=== Movement ===
The yellow-billed cacique is believed to be a sedentary year-round resident throughout its range though some elevational movements are suspected in the Andes.

=== Feeding ===
The yellow-billed cacique feeds mostly on insects; its diet also includes other arthropods, maybe small invertebrates, and rarely fruit. It often feeds like a woodpecker, hammering and probing bamboo, stems, and rotten wood to extract prey. It also exposes prey by inserting its closed bill into a substrate and opening it. It typically forages in pairs and family groups and regularly joins mixed-species feeding flocks in the understory. It is generally secretive while foraging.

=== Breeding ===
The yellow-billed cacique's breeding season has not been fully defined, and varies geographically. It spans April to June in Costa Rica and includes June in Colombia and December in Ecuador. Its nest is a bulky cup made from plant material including bamboo leaves, other leaves, and grass. It is typically placed in a tree crotch, a cluster of bamboo stems, or similar substrate up to about 6 m (20 ft) above the ground. The clutch is two eggs that are pale blue with black markings. It appears that the female alone incubates; both parents provision nestlings. The incubation period, time to fledging, and other details of parental care are not known. In at least Costa Rica the shiny cowbird (Molothrus bonariensis) is a frequent brood parasite.

=== Vocalization ===
Pairs of yellow-billed caciques duet. Males sing "a loud Teeer-purr'weeuur!-Teeer-purr'weeuur-Teeer-purr'weeuur-Teeer-purr'weeuur..." and females reply with a "long down-slurred whistle, followed by a harsh nasal chatter". Their call is "a husky, burry scolding". In the western lowlands of Ecuador males sing "a series of loud ringing whistled notes, e.g. pee!-pee!-peeo-peeo-peeo...". They also sing a "whew-whew, whew-whew..." that the female answers with "wheee? chrrr". On the eastern side of Ecuador its song is "markedly higher-pitched and shriller, teeeeee teeuw teeeee, teeeee teeuw teeeee" that the female answers with a "wheee? chrrr" like the western birds.

== Conservation status ==
The IUCN has assessed the yellow-billed cacique as being of Least Concern. It has an extremely large range; its estimated population of at least 500,000 mature individuals is believed to be decreasing. No immediate threats have been identified. It is considered uncommon in northern Central America, fairly common in Costa Rica, "uncommon...and perhaps also local" in Venezuela, uncommon in Tumbes, Peru, and fairly common in the Peruvian Andes. It is found in many protected areas.
