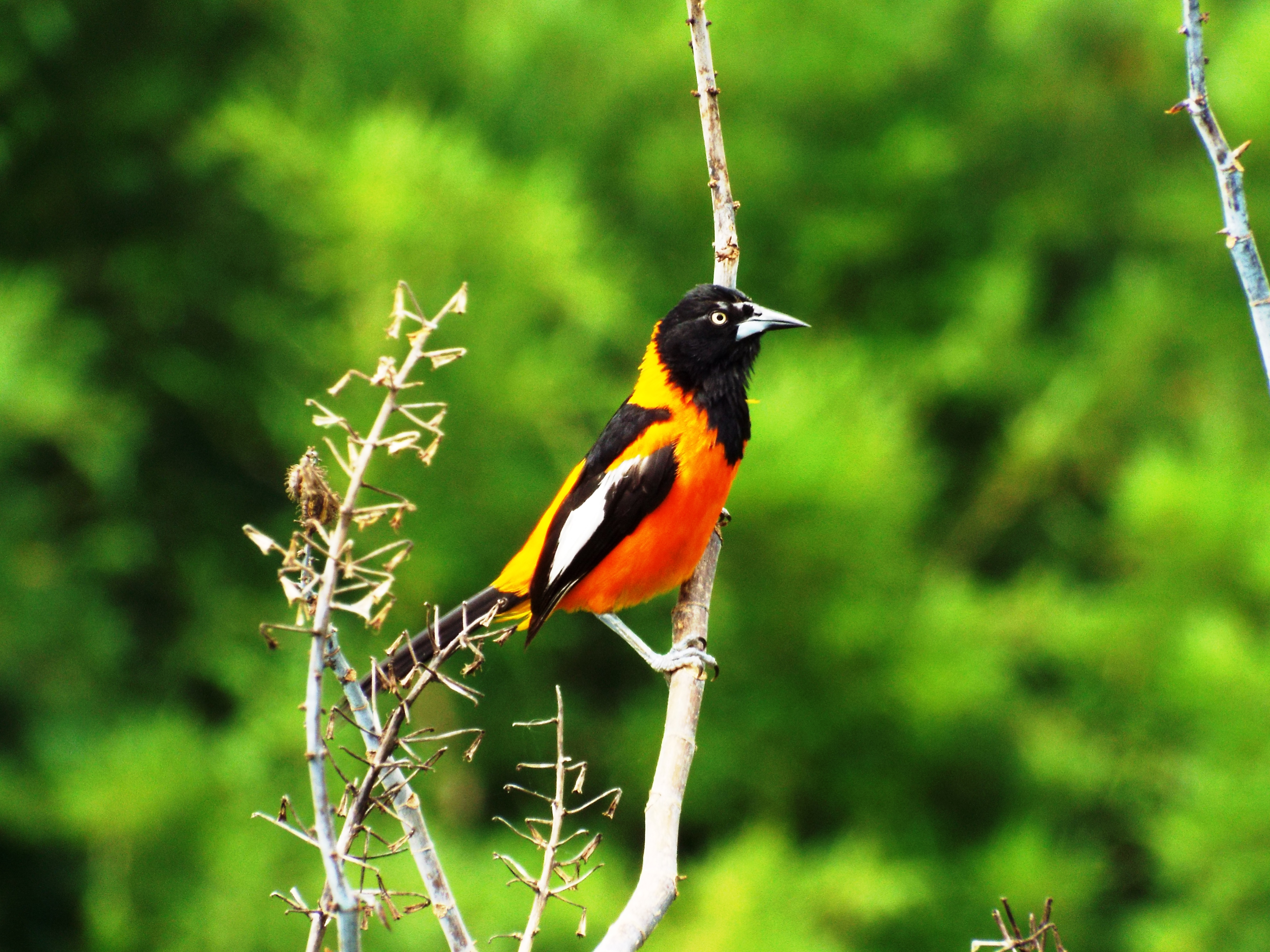

Conservation status
- Least Concern (IUCN 3.1)

Scientific classification
- Kingdom: Animalia
- Phylum: Chordata
- Class: Aves
- Order: Passeriformes
- Family: Icteridae
- Genus: Icterus
- Species: I. jamacaii

Binomial name
- Icterus jamacaii (Gmelin, JF, 1788)

= Campo troupial =

Species of bird

The campo troupial or campo oriole (Icterus jamacaii) is a species of bird in the family Icteridae that is found in northeastern Brazil. At one time thought to be conspecific with the Venezuelan troupial and orange-backed troupial, it is now accepted as a separate species. It is a fairly common bird and the International Union for Conservation of Nature has rated it as a "least-concern species".

== Taxonomy ==
The campo troupial was formally described in 1788 by the German naturalist Johann Friedrich Gmelin in his revised and expanded edition of Carl Linnaeus's Systema Naturae. He placed it with the orioles in the genus Oriolus and coined the binomial name Oriolus jamacaii. Gmelin's text was based ultimately on the "Jamacaii" that had been described and illustrated in 1648 by the German naturalist Georg Marcgrave in his work Historia Naturalis Brasiliae. Marcgrave wrote that Jamacaii was the Brazilian name for the bird. The name is not listed in Rodolpho Garcia's list of Tupi bird names but it may have been applied to the species by Portuguese settlers. The campo troupial is now placed in the genus Icterus that was introduced by Mathurin Brisson in 1760. The species in monotypic: no subspecies are recognised. The genus name Icterus is from Greek ἴκτερος (íkteros, "jaundice"); the icterus was a bird the sight of which was believed to cure jaundice, perhaps the Eurasian golden oriole. The specific name jamacaii comes from the name used for this species by Marcgrave. Additional names used for this species in the 1800s include black-banded troupiale, soffre, and (erroneously) Jamaica yellow bird.

== Description ==
The campo troupial is very similar in appearance to the Venezuelan troupial (Icterus icterus) with which it was at one time thought to be conspecific. It is a robust bird about 23 cm (9 in) long with a long tail and a broad beak. It is bright orange apart from a black hood and bib, back, wings and tail. There is an uneven line dividing the bib from the breast. It differs from the Venezuelan troupial in having only a small patch of white on its wings and hardly any bluish skin around its eye, and it has orange epaulettes on its shoulders whereas the Venezuelan bird does not. It could also be confused with the orange-backed troupial (Icterus croconotus), with which it was also once considered conspecific, but that species has an orange head apart from a patch of black on its forehead, a sharp dividing line between its bib and its breast, and rather more orange on its back.

== Distribution and habitat ==
The campo troupial is endemic to northeastern Brazil, where its area of occurrence is estimated to be over 2,000,000 square kilometres (770,000 sq mi). It typically inhabits dry scrubland and deciduous woodland, at elevations up to 700 m (2,300 ft) or more. The ranges of the Venezuelan troupial, the campo troupial and the orange-backed troupial do not overlap.

== Behaviour ==
The diet consists of insects and other small invertebrates, fruits and nectar; one individual was found to have 126 fly larvae in its stomach. Breeding takes place during the wet season, between December and March.

== Status ==
The campo troupial is a fairly common bird with a wide range and the population seems to be stable. For these reasons, the International Union for Conservation of Nature has rated its conservation status as being of "least concern".
