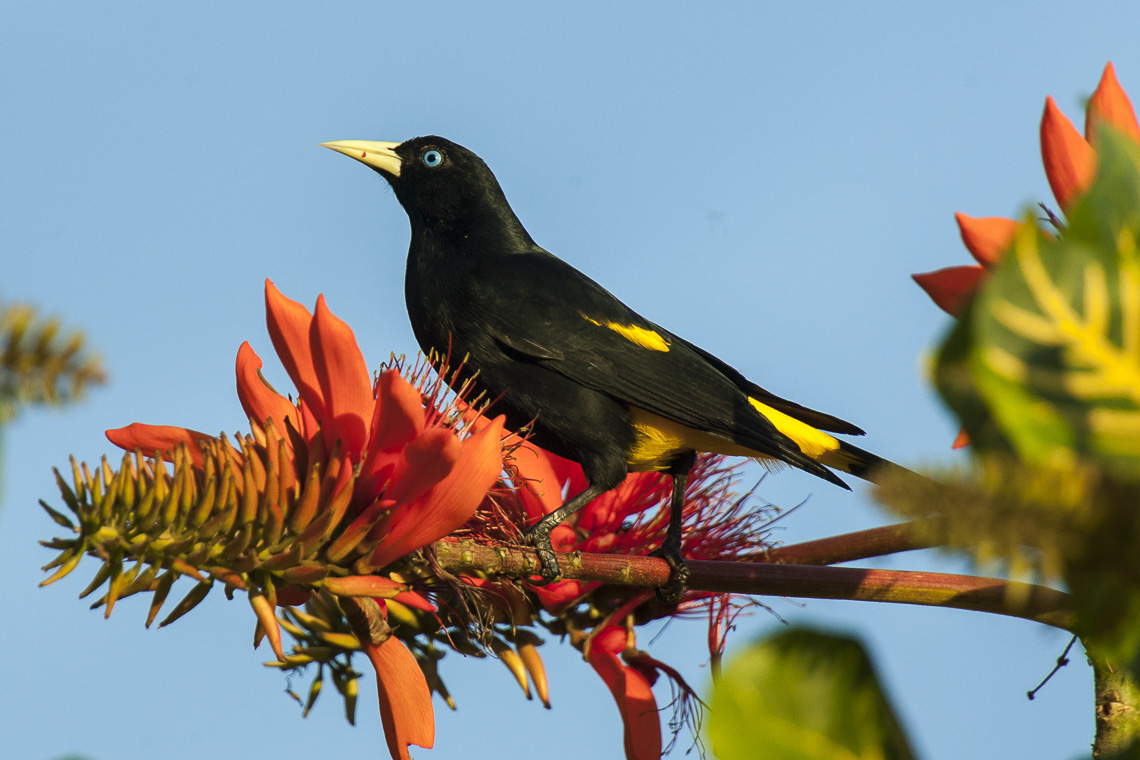
- in Brazil

Conservation status
- Least Concern (IUCN 3.1)

Scientific classification
- Kingdom: Animalia
- Phylum: Chordata
- Class: Aves
- Order: Passeriformes
- Family: Icteridae
- Genus: Cacicus
- Species: C. cela

Binomial name
- Cacicus cela (Linnaeus, 1758)
- Global range (green)

Synonyms
- Parus cela Linnaeus, 1758; Oriolus persicus Linnaeus, 1766

= Yellow-rumped cacique =

Species of bird

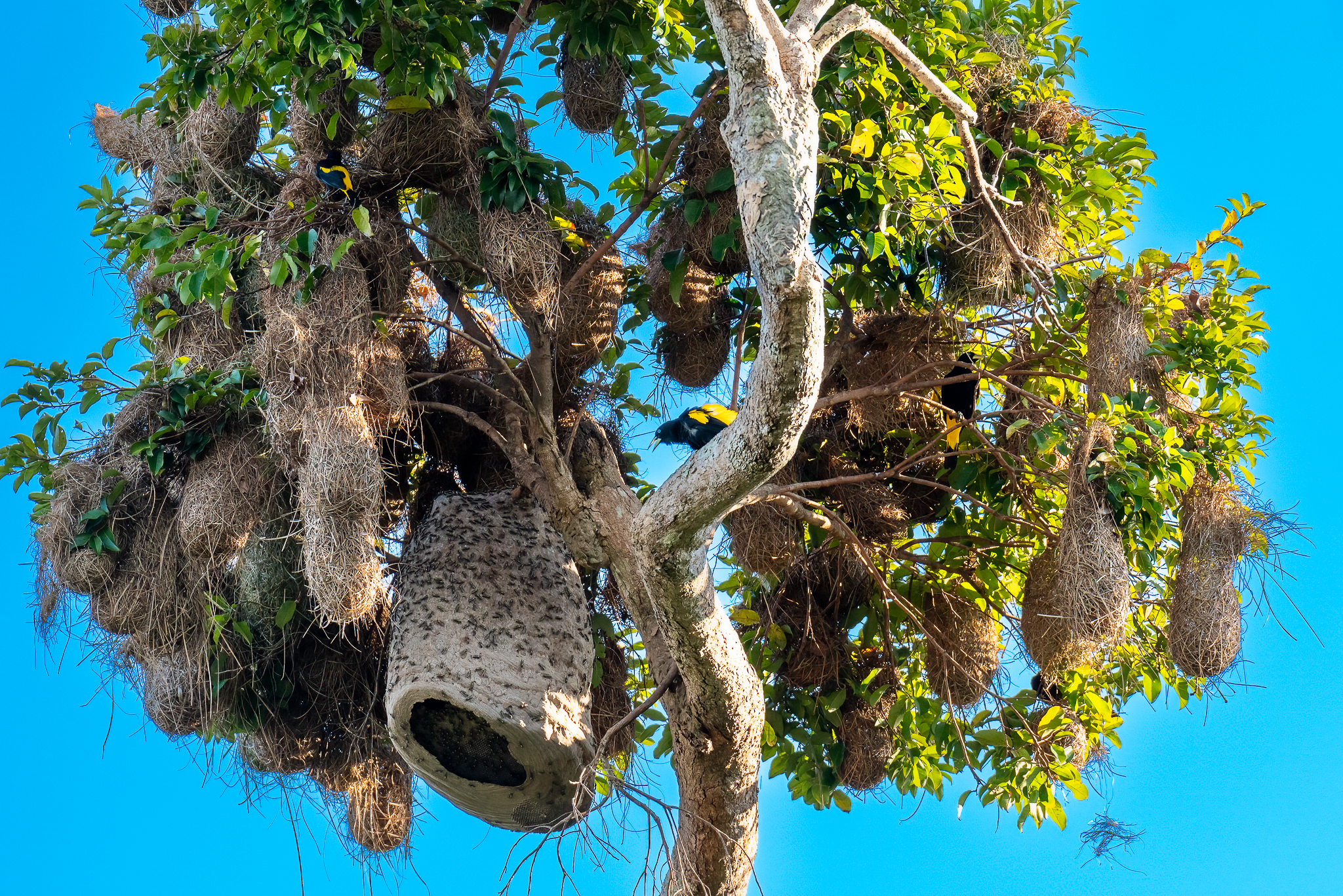

The yellow-rumped cacique (Cacicus cela) is a passerine bird in the New World family Icteridae. It breeds in much of northern South America from Panama, Venezuela and Trinidad south to Peru, Bolivia and central Brazil. However, they have been sighted as far north as Nayarit state in Mexico.

== Taxonomy ==
The yellow-rumped cacique was formally described by the Swedish naturalist Carl Linnaeus in 1758 in the tenth edition of his Systema Naturae under the binomial name Parus cela. Why Linnaeus picked this specific epithet is uncertain but it may be shorthand for the Ancient Greek kelainos meaning "black". Linnaeus mistakenly specified the Habitat as in Indiis (India). The type location was designated as Suriname by the Austrian ornithologist Carl Eduard Hellmayr in 1906. The yellow-rumped cacique is now placed in the genus Cacique that was introduced by the Bernard Germain de Lacépède in 1799.

Three subspecies are recognised:

- C. c. vitellinus Lawrence, 1864 – Panama Canal Zone to north and central Colombia
- C. c. flavicrissus (Sclater, PL, 1860) – west Ecuador and northwest Peru
- C. c. cela (Linnaeus, 1758) – east Colombia and Venezuela, the Guianas, south to central Bolivia and south Brazil

The first two subspecies may be a separate species, the saffron-rumped cacique.

== Description ==
The male is on average 28 centimetres (11 in) long and weighs about 104 grams (3.7 oz), with the female 23 centimetres (9.1 in) long and weighing approximately 60 grams (2.1 oz). The yellow-rumped cacique is a slim bird, with a long tail, blue eyes, and a pale yellow pointed bill. It has mainly black plumage, apart from a bright yellow rump, tail base, lower belly and wing "epaulets". The female is duller black than the male, and the juvenile bird resembles the female, but has dark eyes and a brown bill base.

The song of the male yellow-rumped cacique is a brilliant mixture of fluting notes with cackles, wheezes and sometimes mimicry. There are also many varied calls, and an active colony can be heard from a considerable distance.

== Distribution and habitat ==
Showing the yellow rump, Brazil

The yellow-rumped cacique is a bird associated with open woodland or cultivation with large trees.

== Behaviour and ecology ==
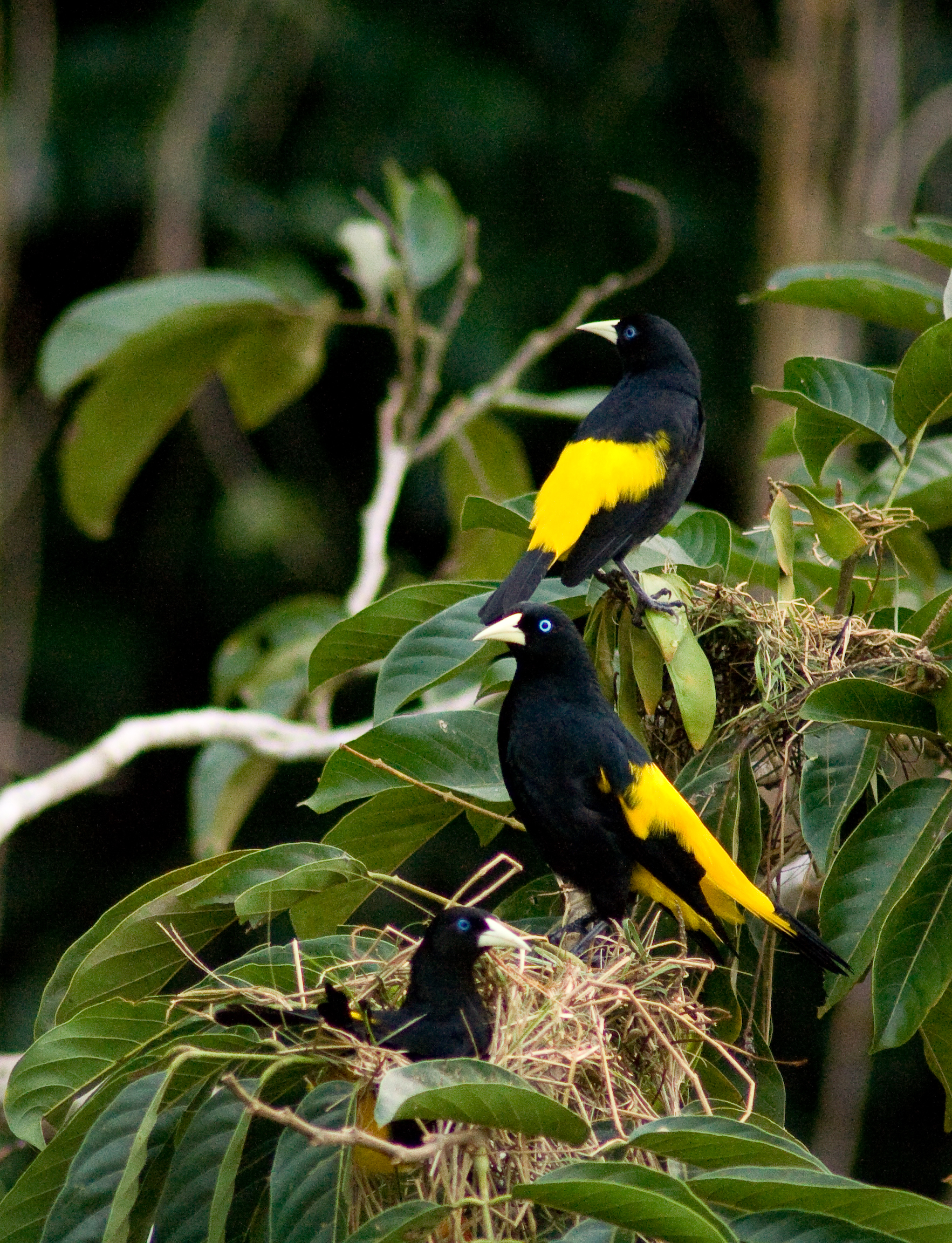
Nesting in Peru

This gregarious bird eats large insects (such as beetles, caterpillars, crickets, grasshoppers and katydids), spiders (such as orb-weavers), nectar and fruit (such as chupa-chupa and figs).

=== Breeding ===
It is a colonial breeder, with up to 100 bag-shaped nests in a tree, which usually also contains an active wasp nest. The females build the nests, incubate, and care for the young. Each nest is 30–45 cm long and widens at the base, and is suspended from the end of a branch. Females compete for the best sites near the protection of the wasp nest. The normal clutch is two dark-blotched pale blue or white eggs. Females begin incubating after laying the second egg; hatching occurs after 13 or 14 days. The young fledge in 34 to 40 days, usually only one per nest.

== Relationship with humans ==
The yellow-rumped cacique has benefited from the more open habitat created by forest clearance and ranching. It is not considered threatened by the IUCN.

In Peruvian folklore, this species – like other caciques and oropendolas – is called paucar, or – referring to this species only – paucarcillo ("little paucar"). This species is apparently the paucar that, according to a folktale of Moyobamba, originated as a rumor-mongering boy who always wore black pants and a yellow jacket. When he spread an accusation against an old woman who was a fairy in disguise, she turned him into a noisy, wandering bird. The bird's appearance is thought to augur good news.

== Sources ==
- Cuervo, Andrés M.; Hernández-Jaramillo, Alejandro; Cortés-Herrera, José Oswaldo & Laverde, Oscar (2007): Nuevos registros de aves en la parte alta de la Serranía de las Quinchas, Magdalena medio, Colombia [New bird records from the highlands of Serranía de las Quinchas, middle Magdalena valley, Colombia]. Ornitología Colombiana 5: 94–98 [Spanish with English abstract]. PDF fulltext
- Enjoy Peru [2008]: Manu – Aves. Retrieved 2008-DEC-22.
- moyobamba.com (2007): Leyendas e historia de los barrios. Retrieved 2007-SEP-28.
- Jaramillo, Alvaro & Burke, Peter (1999): New World Blackbirds. Christopher Helm, London. ISBN 0-7136-4333-1
