= Grackle =

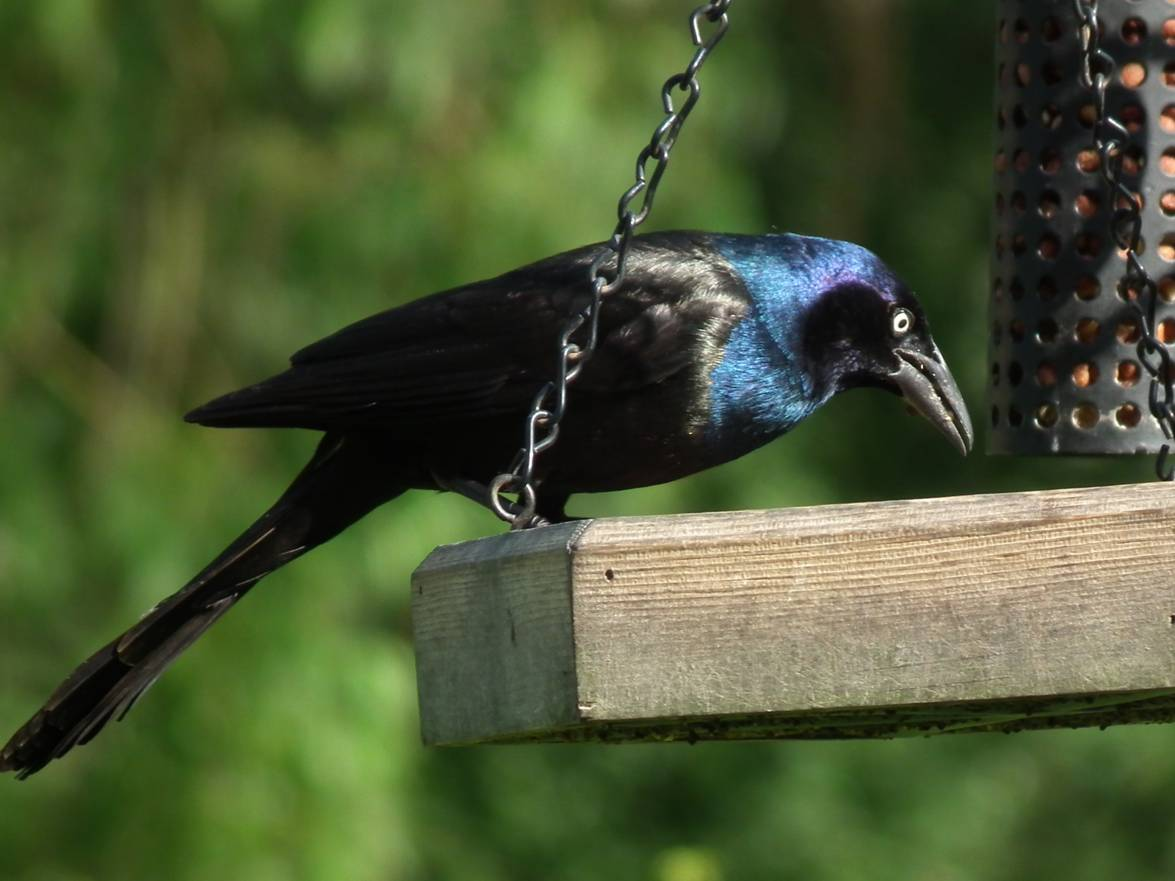
Common grackle

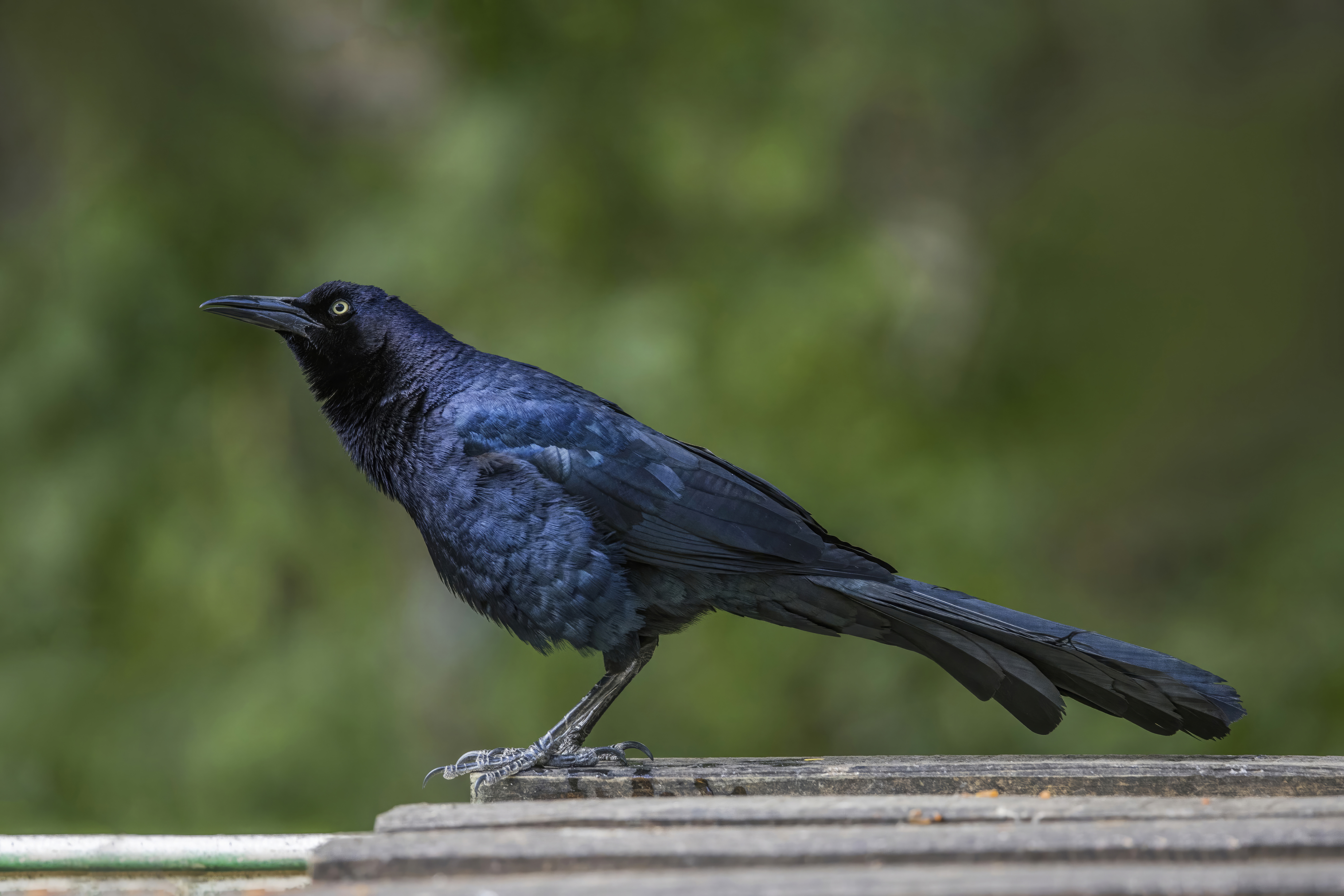
Great-tailed grackle

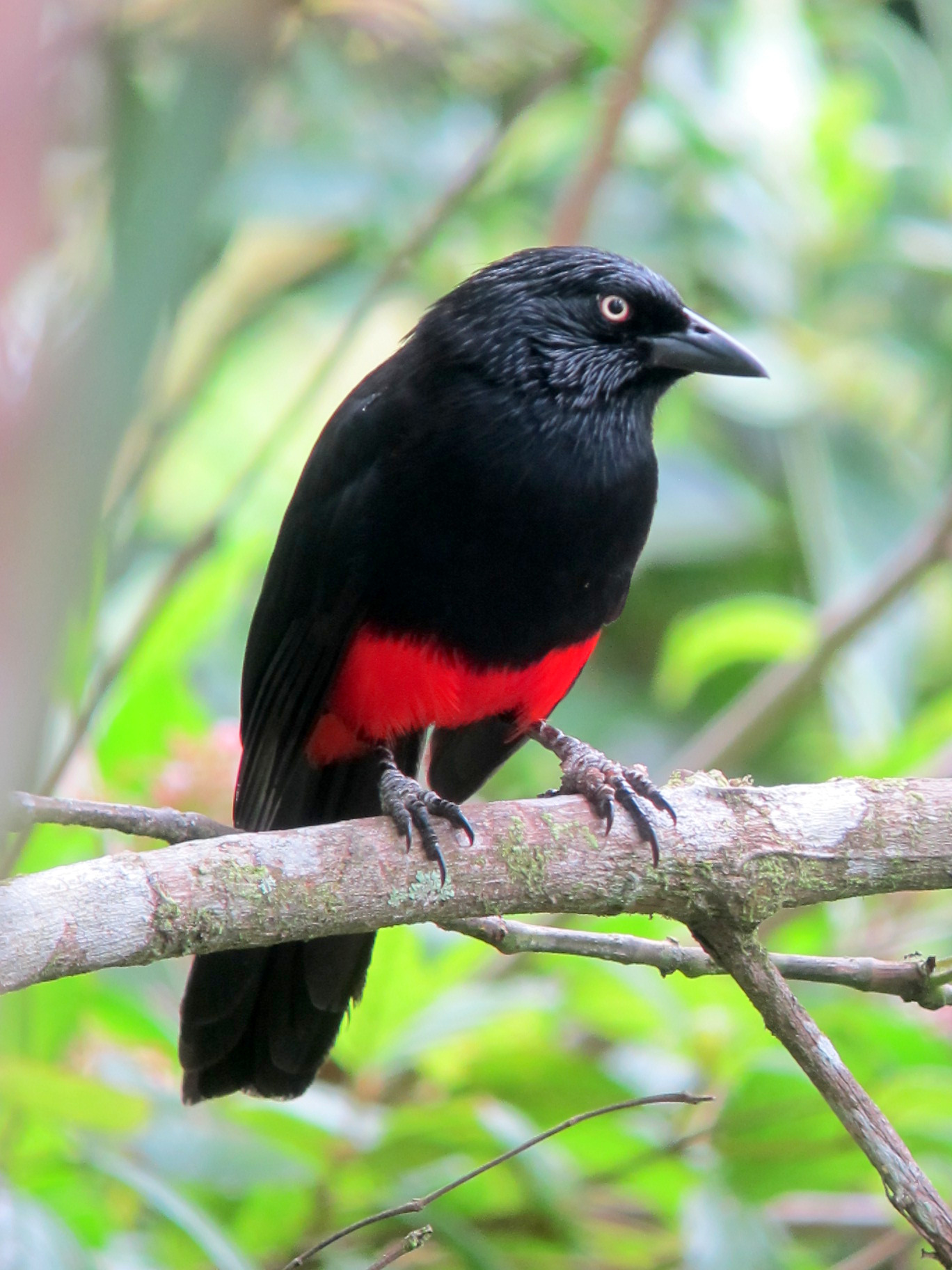
Red-bellied grackle

Grackles is the common name of any of 11 species of passerine birds (10 extant and one extinct) native to North and South America. They belong to various genera in the icterid family. In all the species with this name, adult males have black or mostly black plumage. Baby birds use a screech-like call to indicate they wish to feed.

- Genus Quiscalus
  - Boat-tailed grackle, Quiscalus major
  - Common grackle, Quiscalus quiscula
  - Great-tailed grackle, Quiscalus mexicanus
  - Nicaraguan grackle, Quiscalus nicaraguensis
  - Greater Antillean grackle, Quiscalus niger
  - Carib grackle, Quiscalus lugubris
  - Slender-billed grackle, Quiscalus palustris: extinct (1910)
- Genus Hypopyrrhus
  - Red-bellied grackle, Hypopyrrhus pyrohypogaster
- Genus Lampropsar
  - Velvet-fronted grackle, Lampropsar tanagrinus
- Genus Macroagelaius
  - Golden-tufted grackle, Macroagelaius imthurni
  - Colombian mountain grackle, Macroagelaius subalaris

Sometimes members of the starling family have historically been called grackles. Tristram's starling is sometimes known as "Tristram's grackle", and the hill mynas in the genus Gracula have also been called grackles.
