= Q. palustris =

Q. palustris may refer to:

- Quercus palustris, the pin oak or Swamp Spanish oak, a tree species native to eastern North America
- Quiscalus palustris, the slender-billed grackle, a species of bird in the icterid family
