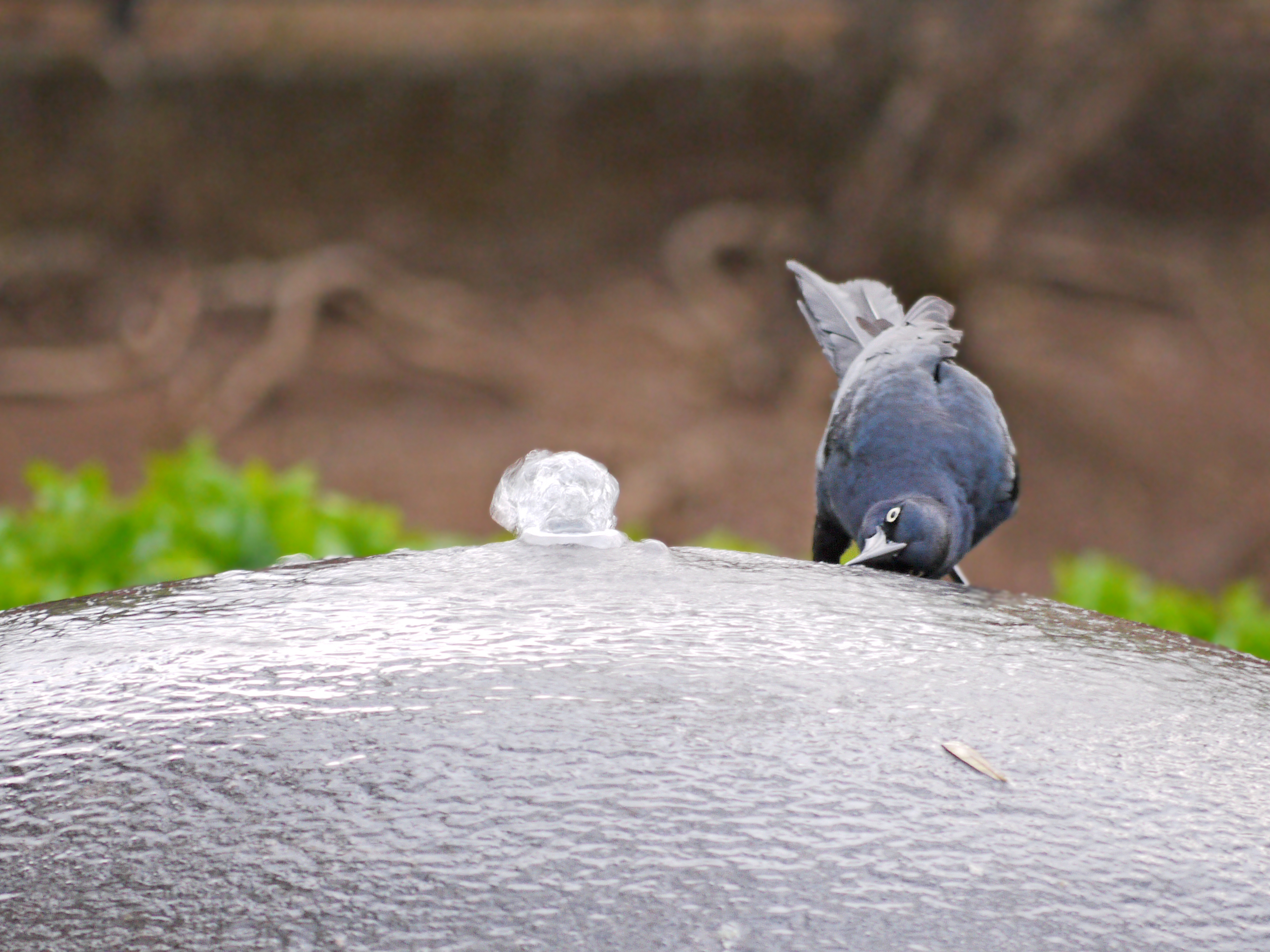

Conservation status
- Least Concern (IUCN 3.1)

Scientific classification
- Kingdom: Animalia
- Phylum: Chordata
- Class: Aves
- Order: Passeriformes
- Family: Icteridae
- Genus: Quiscalus
- Species: Q. nicaraguensis

Binomial name
- Quiscalus nicaraguensis Salvin & Godman, 1891

= Nicaraguan grackle =

Species of bird

The Nicaraguan grackle (Quiscalus nicaraguensis) is a species of passerine bird belonging to the genus Quiscalus, a genus of grackles in the New World blackbird family, Icteridae. It is found only in Nicaragua and northernmost Costa Rica.

== Description ==
It is a medium-sized bird with a long, graduated tail and fairly long bill and legs. The bill and legs are black and the eye is pale yellow. The male is about 31 cm long while the female is 25 cm. The adult male's plumage is entirely black with an iridescent gloss. The gloss is violet on the belly and tail, violet-green on the head, back, and breast, and blue-green on most of the wings. The tail of the male is V-shaped, rising from the centre to the outer feathers. Immature males are duller and less glossy than the adults, with a brown belly and thighs. The female is brown above with a pale supercilium (the stripe over the eye), made more obvious by the dark lores and ear coverts. The thighs, flanks, and undertail coverts are dark brown, while the rest of the underparts are buff, darkest on the upper breast, and paler on the throat and belly.

The similar great-tailed grackle (Quiscalus mexicanus) overlaps with it in range, but is larger, with a longer tail and larger bill. The male has a less green gloss than the Nicaraguan grackle, while the female is darker below and has a less obvious supercilium.

The Nicaraguan grackle has a variety of calls, including a frequent nasal call, various whistling notes, and a sharp, rising whine. The song is a series of whistles, which increase in speed and frequency.

== Distribution and habitat ==
It is restricted to western Nicaragua and northern Costa Rica. It mainly occurs in the vicinity of Lake Nicaragua and Lake Managua, but its range has expanded a little due to the clearance of forest and creation of pastures by man. It may be a fairly recent arrival in Costa Rica, where it is found in the Caño Negro area along the Río Frio. It is not migratory, but makes some local movements in response to seasons and changes in water level.

It nests only in marshland, but forages in scrubland, wet pastures, and along lake shores and riverbanks.

== Behaviour ==
It feeds in small groups, foraging on the ground for seeds and insects. It turns over stones or debris to look for food underneath, and often forages on or around cattle.

It nests in small colonies in bushes or trees or among marsh vegetation such as sedges. The well-hidden nest is cup-shaped and made from grass and sedge leaves and roots. Two or three eggs are laid; they are blue with dark markings concentrated at the larger end. Only the female incubates the eggs, but both sexes are involved in feeding the young.
