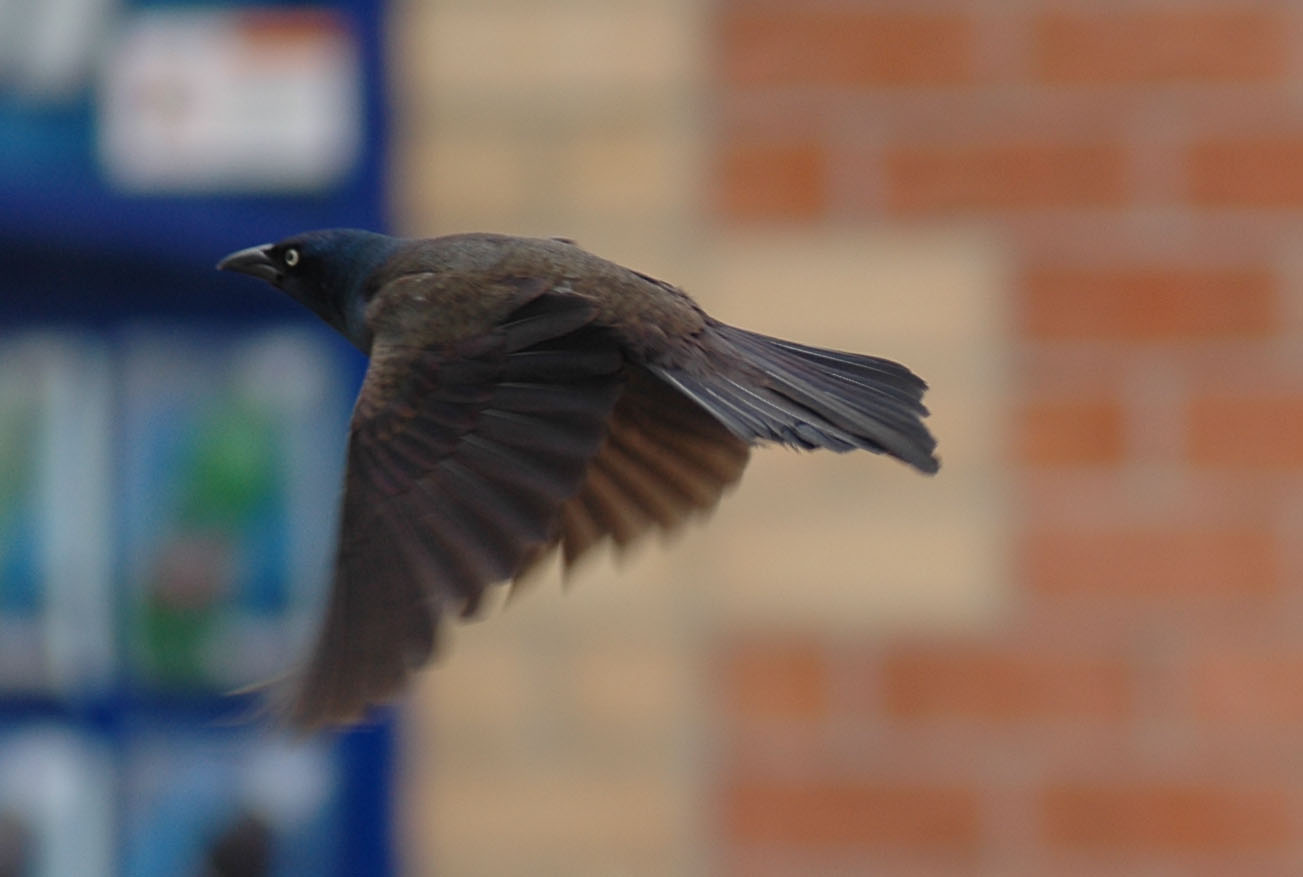
- Common grackle (Quiscalus quiscula)

Scientific classification
- Kingdom: Animalia
- Phylum: Chordata
- Class: Aves
- Order: Passeriformes
- Family: Icteridae
- Genus: Quiscalus; Vieillot, 1816

Type species
- Gracula quiscula Linnaeus, 1758

Species
- Quiscalus quiscula; Quiscalus major; Quiscalus mexicanus; Quiscalus nicaraguensis; Quiscalus niger; Quiscalus lugubris; Quiscalus palustris (†)

= Quiscalus =

Genus of birds

The avian genus Quiscalus contains seven of the 11 species of grackles, gregarious passerine birds in the icterid family. They are native to North and South America.

The genus was named and described by French ornithologist Louis Pierre Vieillot in 1816. The type species was subsequently designated as the common grackle (Quiscalus quiscula) by English zoologist George Robert Gray in 1840. The genus name comes from the specific name Gracula quiscula coined by Swedish naturalist Carl Linnaeus for the common grackle. From where Linnaeus obtained the word is uncertain, but it may come from the Taíno word quisqueya, meaning "mother of all lands", for the island of Hispaniola.

The genus contains six extant species and one extinct species:

Male	Female	Common name	Scientific name	Distribution
		Quiscalus major	Boat-tailed grackle	Florida and the coastal Southeastern United States
		Quiscalus quiscula	Common grackle	North America
		Quiscalus mexicanus	Great-tailed grackle	northern regions of South America, through the western and central United states with vagrants occasionally into Canada
		†Quiscalus palustris	†Slender-billed grackle	endemic to central Mexico, in the Valley of Mexico and Toluca Valley (extinct around 1910)
		Quiscalus nicaraguensis	Nicaraguan grackle	Nicaragua and northernmost Costa Rica
		Quiscalus niger	Greater Antillean grackle	the Greater Antilles
		Quiscalus lugubris	Carib grackle	Colombia east to Venezuela and northeastern Brazil
