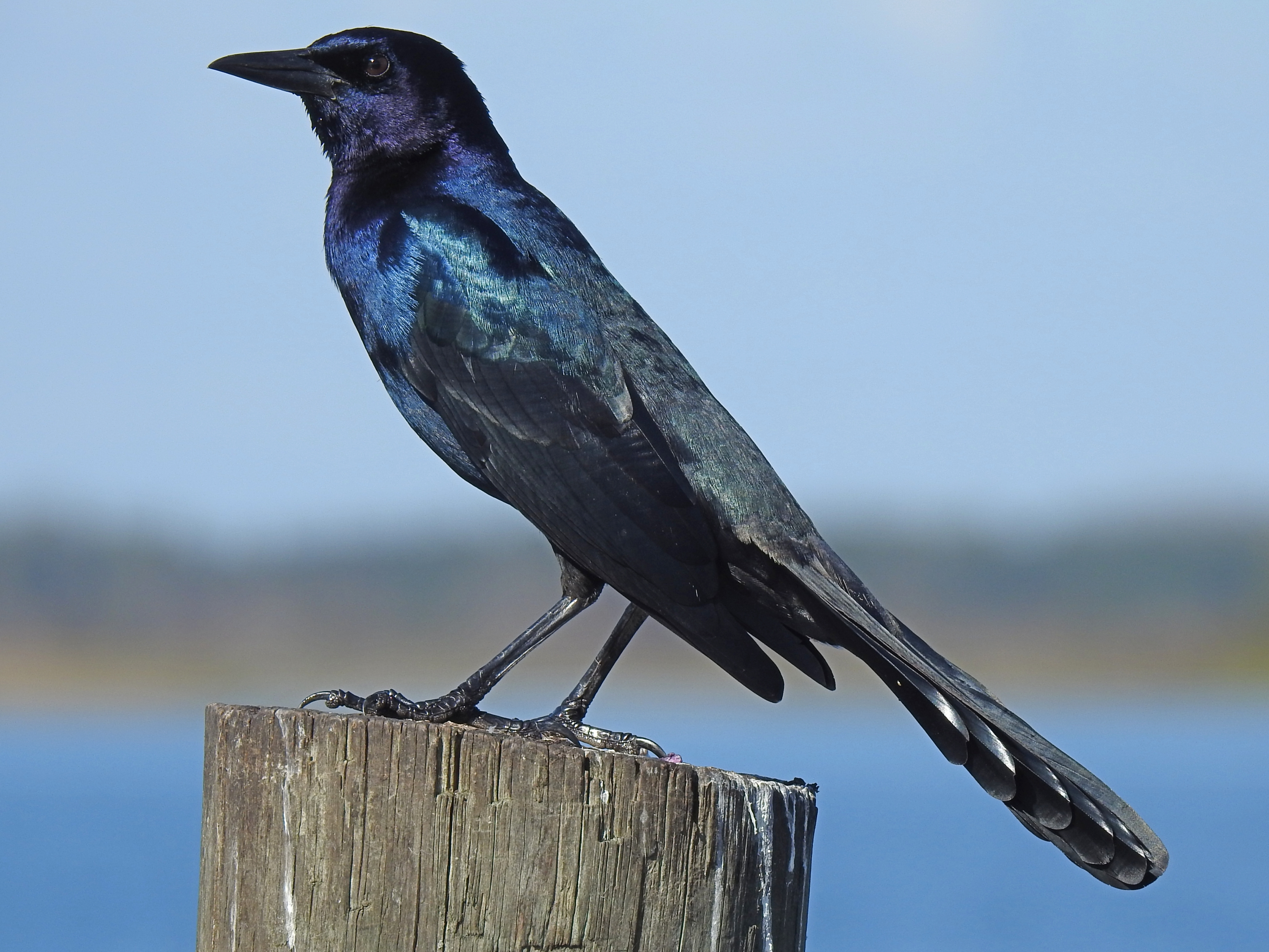
- Breeding Male
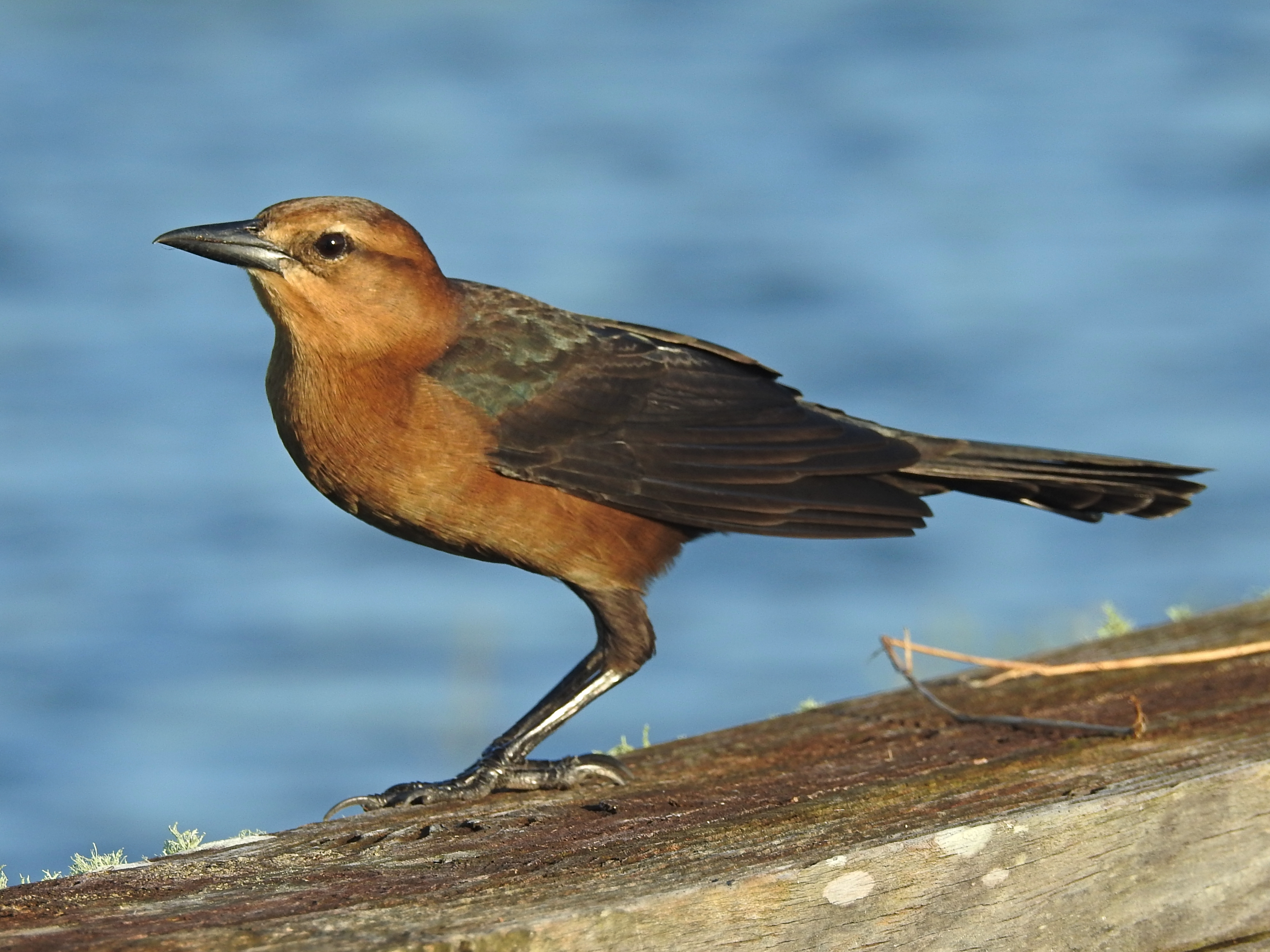
- Female

Conservation status
- Least Concern (IUCN 3.1)

Scientific classification
- Kingdom: Animalia
- Phylum: Chordata
- Class: Aves
- Order: Passeriformes
- Family: Icteridae
- Genus: Quiscalus
- Species: Q. major

Binomial name
- Quiscalus major Vieillot, 1819
- Range of Q. major Year-round range Wintering range

= Boat-tailed grackle =

Species of bird

The boat-tailed grackle (Quiscalus major) is a passerine bird of the family Icteridae found as a permanent resident on the coasts of the Southeastern and Mid-Atlantic United States.

== Habitat ==
The boat-tailed grackle is found in coastal saltwater marshes and across the Florida peninsula. In salt marsh areas, least bitterns will often associate with and make mixed colonies with grackles. Boat-tailed grackles have established significant populations in several United States Gulf Coast cities and towns, using human activity as protection against predation and scavenging through human trash. Urban boat-tailed grackle populations can be found foraging in trash bins, parking lots, and outdoor restaurant patios.

== Breeding ==
The nest is a well-concealed cup in trees and shrubs near water; the average clutch size is just over three eggs.

Male boat-tailed grackles compete to defend and mate with a harem of closely nesting females, although DNA evidence shows that females often successfully mate with other males while away from their colony, with only about a quarter of the young being fathered by the dominant male.

== Description ==
The male boat-tailed grackle is 37–43 cm (15–17 in) long and weighs 165–250 g (5.8–8.8 oz). Adult males have entirely iridescent black plumage, a long dark bill, a pale yellowish or brown iris, and a long keel-shaped tail. The adult female is much smaller at 26–33 cm (10–13 in) long and a weight of 90–115 g (3.2–4.1 oz). She is also distinguished by her shorter tail and tawny-brown coloration, which covers the body apart from the darker wings and tail. The wingspan in adult birds is 39–50 cm (15–20 in). In standard measurements, this species measures 13–20 cm (5.1–7.9 in) along the wing bone, 11–20 cm (4.3–7.9 in) in tail length, 2–4.2 cm (0.79–1.65 in) along the culmen, and 3.6–5.8 cm (1.4–2.3 in) along the tarsus. On average, the boat-tailed grackle weighs about 10% more than the closely related great-tailed grackle, although the male great-tailed grackle has an even longer tail.

Young males are black but lack the adult's iridescence. Immature females are duller versions of the adult female and have blotches or spots on the breast. The eye color of the boat-tailed grackle varies with range. Gulf Coast and inland birds have dark eyes, whereas Atlantic birds have pale eyes.

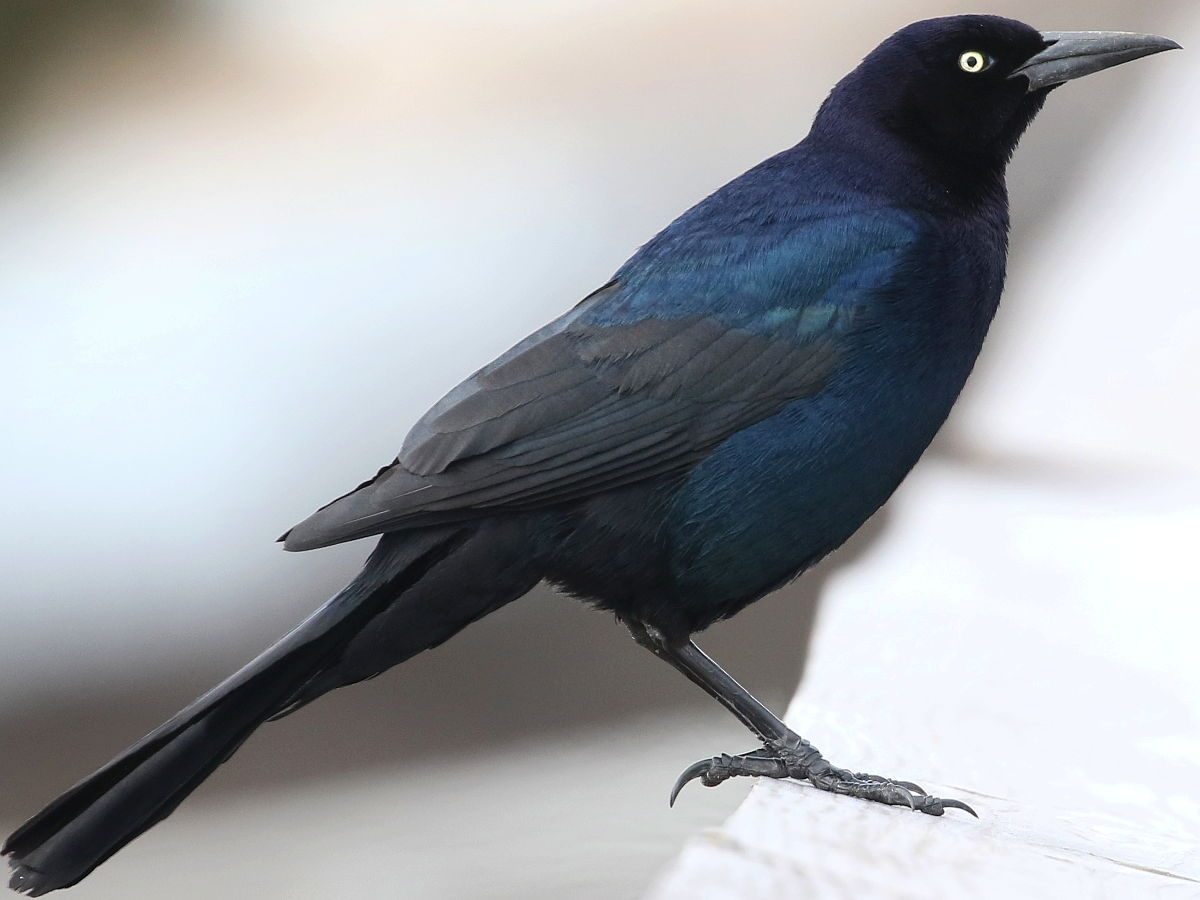
Atlantic coast male with yellow eyes at Assateague Island National Seashore.

== Taxonomy ==
The boat-tailed grackle was first described by French naturalist Louis Pierre Vieillot in 1819. Its specific epithet major means "larger" in Latin. Despite its restricted range, there are four subspecies of the boat-tailed grackle, differing in size and iris color. The boat-tailed grackle was once considered the same species as the great-tailed grackle. The great-tailed species is generally quite similar of slightly smaller body size but has a longer tail and lacks this species' distinct domed head shape. The common grackle, with which the boat-tailed species often overlaps along the Atlantic coastline, is noticeably smaller and shorter-tailed, as well as lacking the domed head shape.

== Diet ==
They forage on the ground, in shallow water, or in shrubs; they will steal food from other birds, animals, or humans. They are omnivorous opportunistic feeders, eating insects, crustaceans, minnows, frogs, eggs, berries, seeds, grain, and even small birds.

== Call ==
Its song is a harsh jeeb, and it has a variety of typically grackle-like chatters and squeaks. Their call lacks of whistles and clucks typical of the great-tailed grackle.

Boat-Tailed Grackle

== Gallery ==
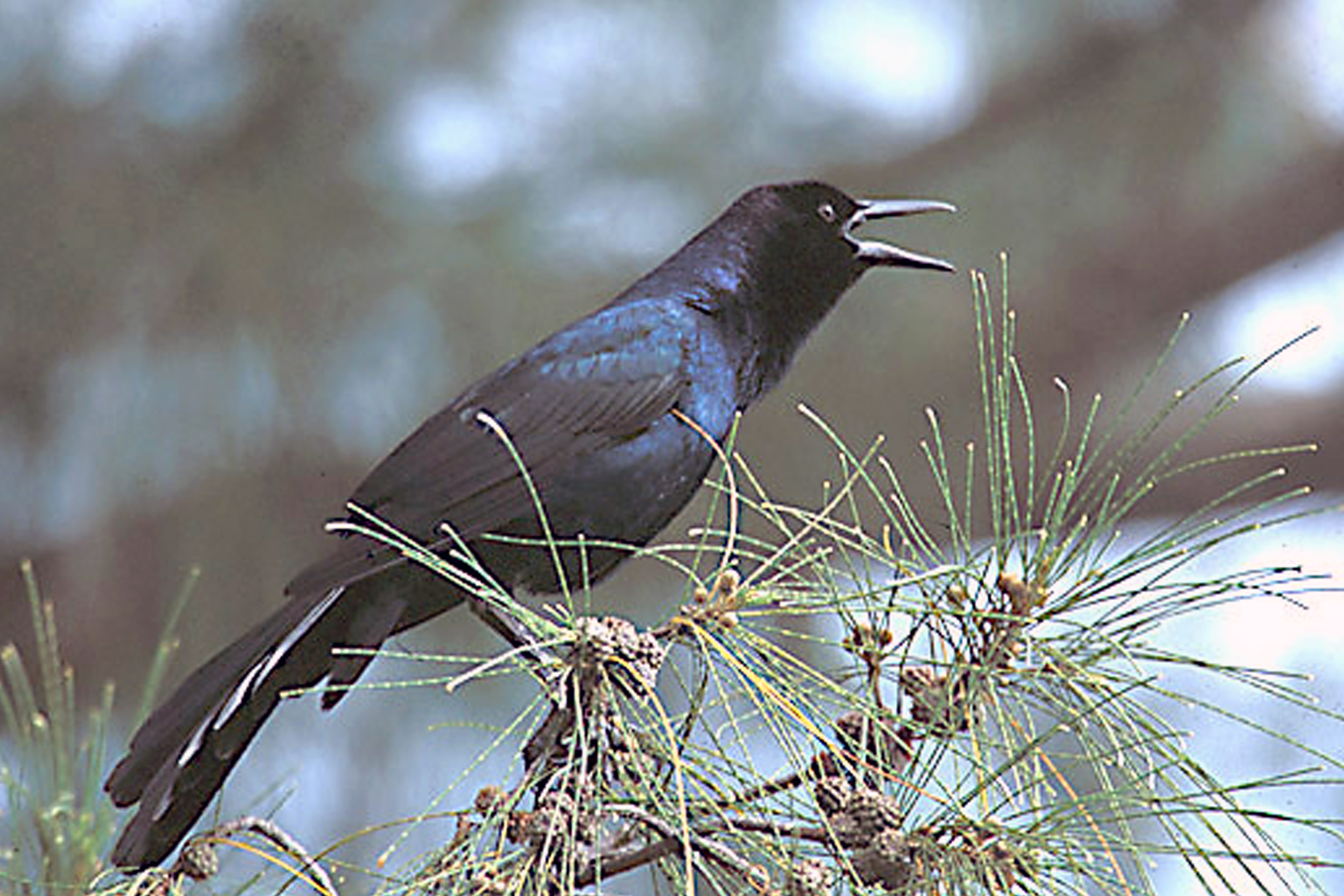
Male vocalizing on Sanibel Island, Florida

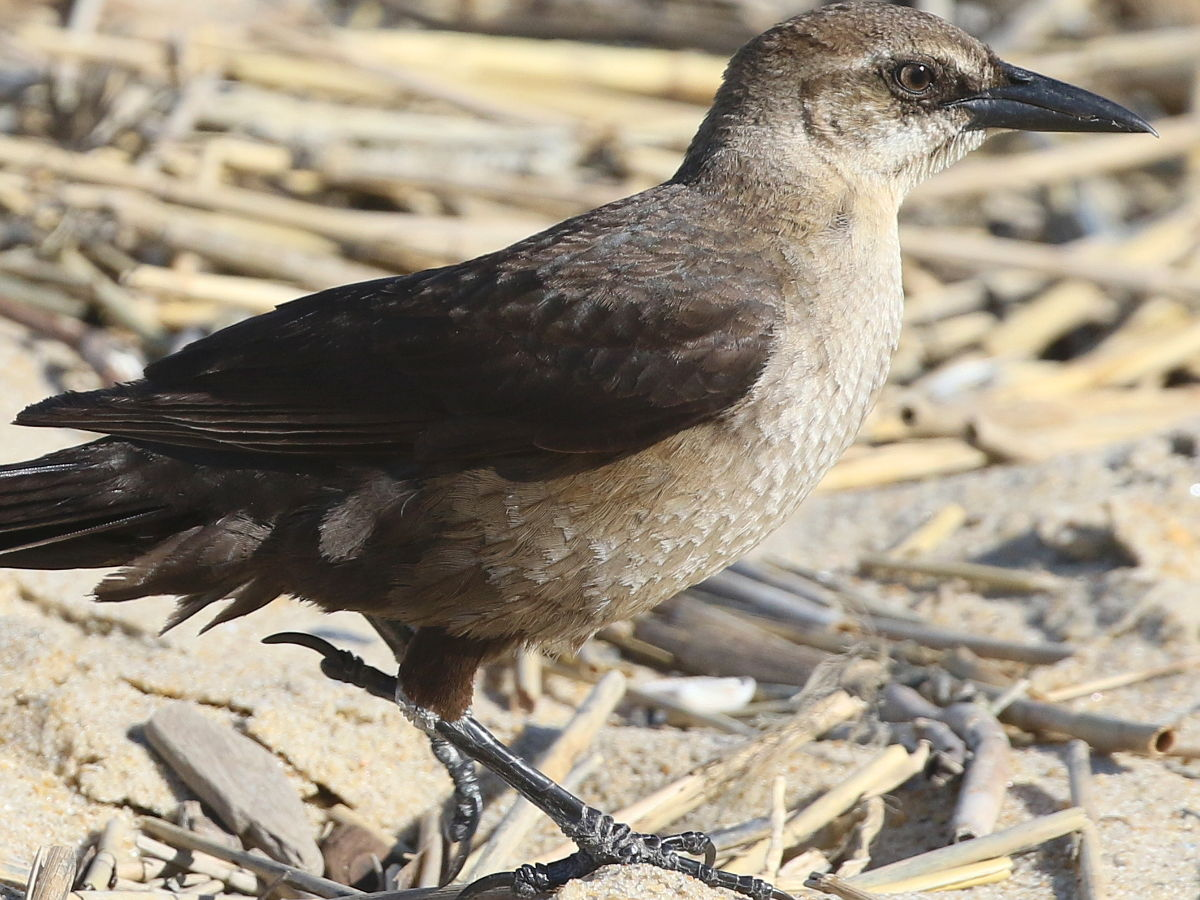
Female at Rodanthe Public Beach, North Carolina

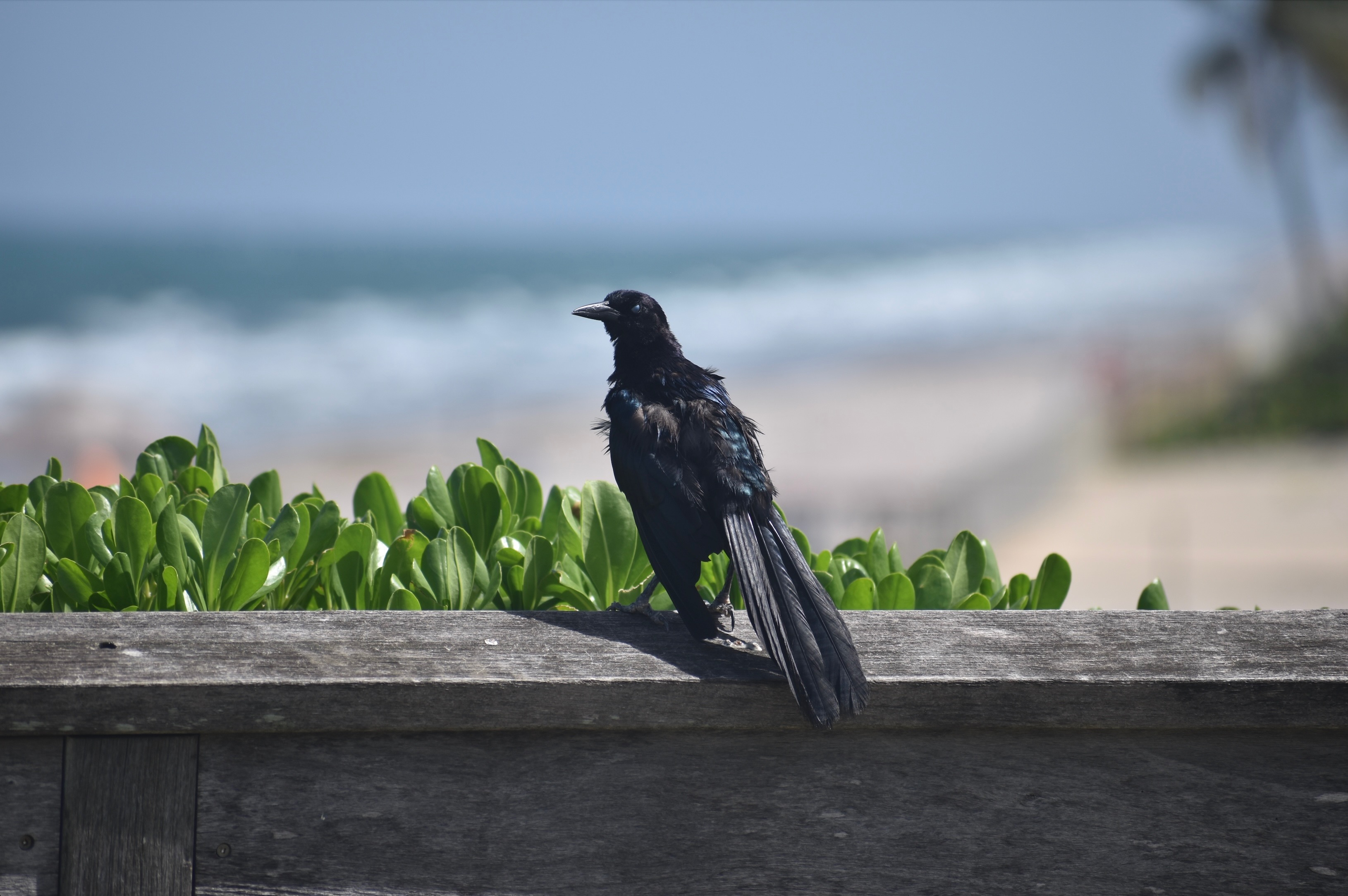
Male at Deerfield Beach, Florida

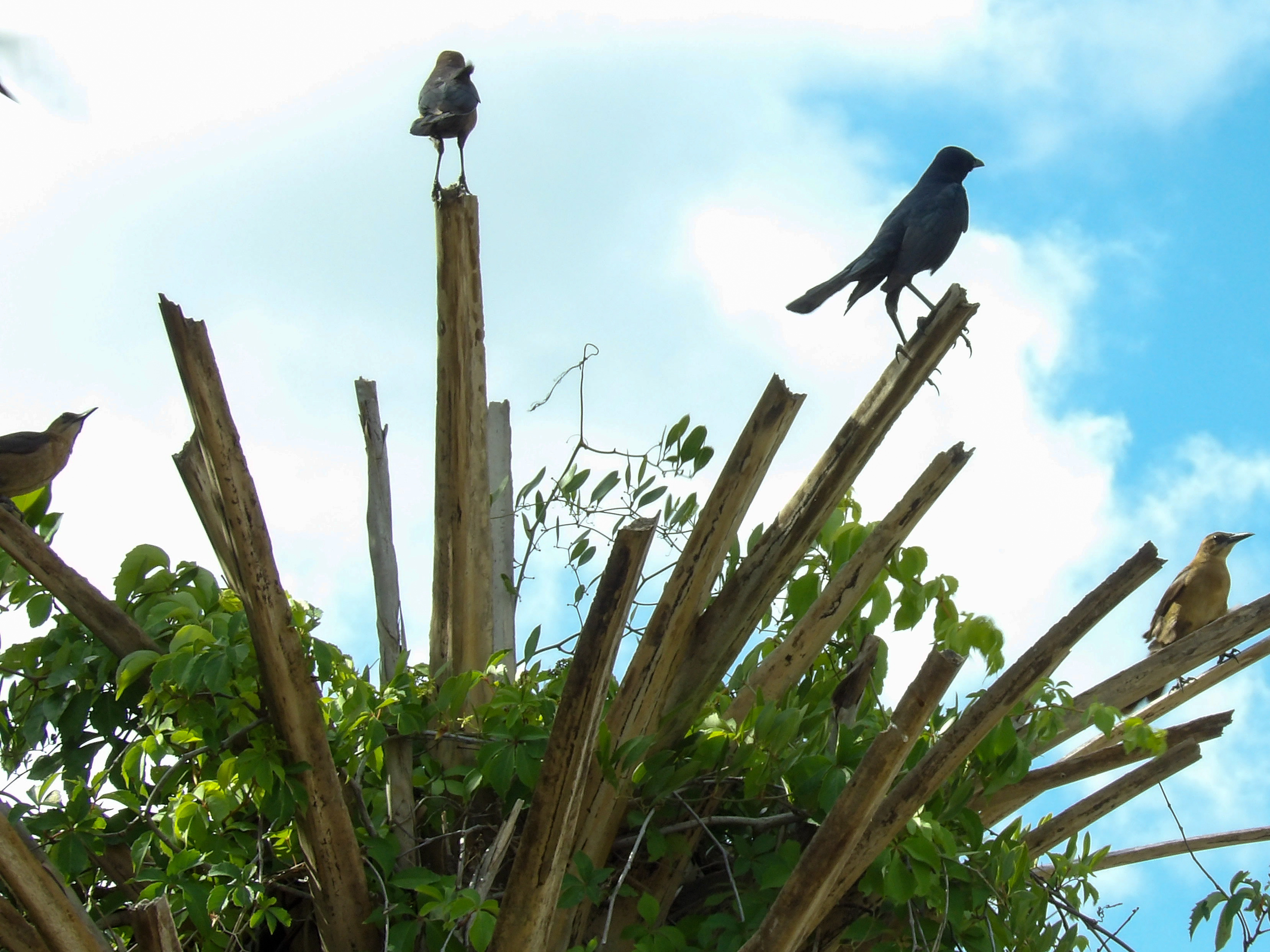
A gathering of Grackles at Winding Waters Nature Area, Florida
