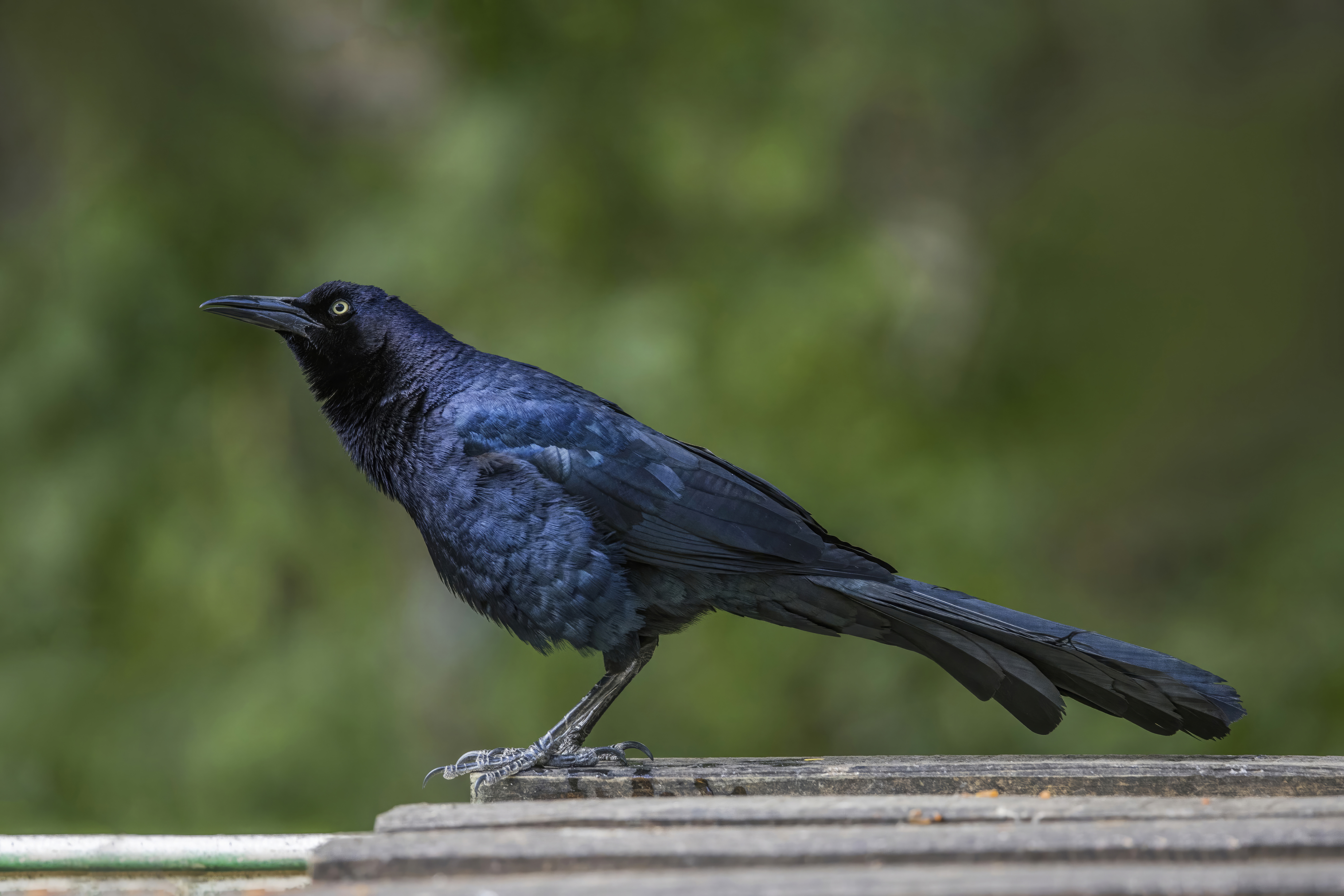
- Male, Honduras
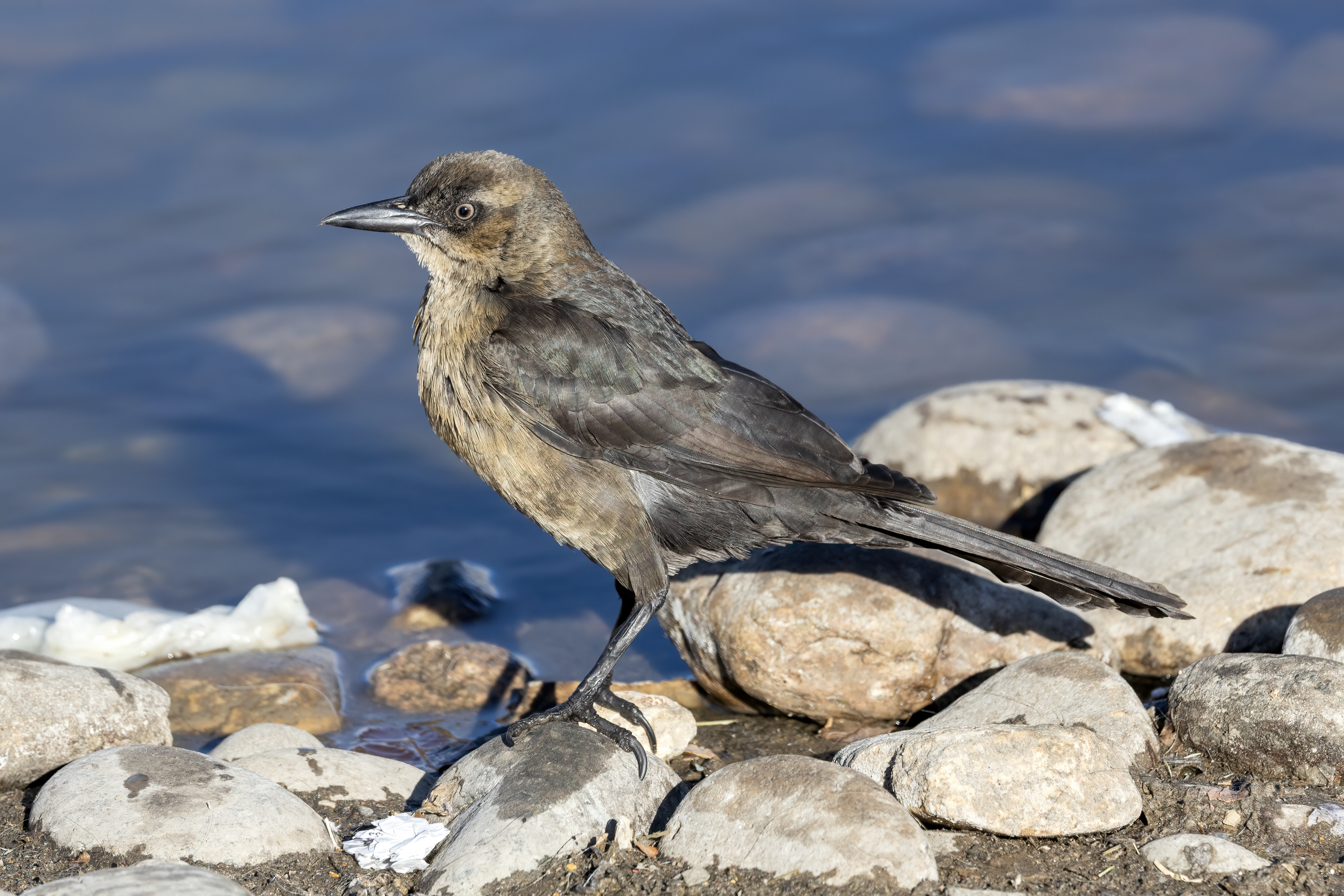
- Female, New Mexico

Conservation status
- Least Concern (IUCN 3.1)

Scientific classification
- Kingdom: Animalia
- Phylum: Chordata
- Class: Aves
- Order: Passeriformes
- Family: Icteridae
- Genus: Quiscalus
- Species: Q. mexicanus

Binomial name
- Quiscalus mexicanus (JF Gmelin, 1788)
- Range of Quiscalus mexicanus

Synonyms
- Corvus mexicanus Gmelin

= Great-tailed grackle =

Species of bird in North America

The great-tailed grackle or Mexican grackle (Quiscalus mexicanus) is a medium-sized, highly social passerine bird native to North and South America. A member of the family Icteridae, it is one of 10 extant species of grackle and is closely related to the boat-tailed grackle and the extinct slender-billed grackle. In the southern and southwestern United States, the grackle is sometimes referred to simply as a "blackbird" or (erroneously) a "crow" due to its glossy black plumage; however, grackles form their own unique genus that is separate from other "blackbirds", such as the red-winged and Brewer's blackbirds, despite being in the same family (Icteridae). Superficially, Brewer's blackbird is one of the most visually similar species to grackles.

In some parts of Mexico, the grackle is sometimes referred to in Spanish as cuervo ("raven"; "crow"), although it is not a member of the crow genus (Corvus) nor of their family (Corvidae).

== Taxonomy ==
The great-tailed grackle was formally described in 1788 by the German naturalist Johann Friedrich Gmelin in his revised and expanded edition of Carl Linnaeus's Systema Naturae. He placed it with the crows in the genus Corvus and coined the binomial name Corvus mexicanus. The type locality has been restricted to the region of Veracruz in Mexico. Gmelin's account was based on De Hocitzanatl that had been described by the Spanish naturalist Francisco Hernández de Toledo in his work Rerum medicarum Novae Hispaniae thesaurus, seu, Plantarum animalium mineralium Mexicanorum historia. The work was published in 1651, long after Hernández's death in 1587. "Hocitzanatl" was the name for the bird in a local Mexican language. The bird was also mentioned in 1770 by the French author Antoine-Joseph Pernety in his work Histoire d'un voyage aux Isles Malouines. The great-tailed grackle is now one of six species placed in the genus Quiscalus that was introduced by Louis Vieillot in 1816.

Eight subspecies are recognised:

- Q. m. nelsoni (Ridgway, 1901) – southwest US and northwest Mexico
- Q. m. graysoni Sclater, PL, 1884 – west Mexico
- Q. m. obscurus Nelson, 1900 – southwest Mexico
- Q. m. monsoni (Phillips, AR, 1950) – central west US to central north Mexico
- Q. m. prosopidicola (Lowery, 1938) – central, central south US to northeast Mexico
- Q. m. mexicanus (Gmelin, JF, 1788) – central Mexico to Nicaragua
- Q. m. loweryi (Dickerman & Phillips, AR, 1966) – Yucatán Peninsula (southeast Mexico), Belize and nearby islands
- Q. m. peruvianus Swainson, 1838 – Costa Rica to coastal north Peru and Venezuela

== Description ==
Great-tailed grackles are medium-sized birds (larger than starlings and smaller than crows; 38–46 cm (15–18 in) with males weighing 203–265 g (7.2–9.3 oz) and females 115–142 g (4.1–5.0 oz), and both sexes have long tails. Wingspan ranging 48–58 cm (19–23 in). Males are iridescent black with a purple-blue sheen on the feathers of the head and upper body, while females are brown with darker wings and tail. Adults of both sexes have bright yellow eyes, while juveniles of both sexes have brown eyes and brown plumage like females (except for streaks on the breast). Great-tailed grackles, particularly the adult males, have a keel-shaped tail that they can fold vertically by aligning the two halves.

The great-tailed grackle and boat-tailed grackle were considered the same species until genetic analyses distinguished them as two separate species.

=== Vocalizations ===
Great-tailed grackles have an unusually large repertoire of vocalizations that are used year-round. The sounds range from "sweet, tinkling notes" to a "rusty gate hinge". Males use a wider variety of vocalization types, while females engage mostly in "chatter", however there is a report of a female performing the "territorial song". Because of their loud vocalizations, great-tailed grackles are considered a pest species by some.

== Distribution and habitat ==
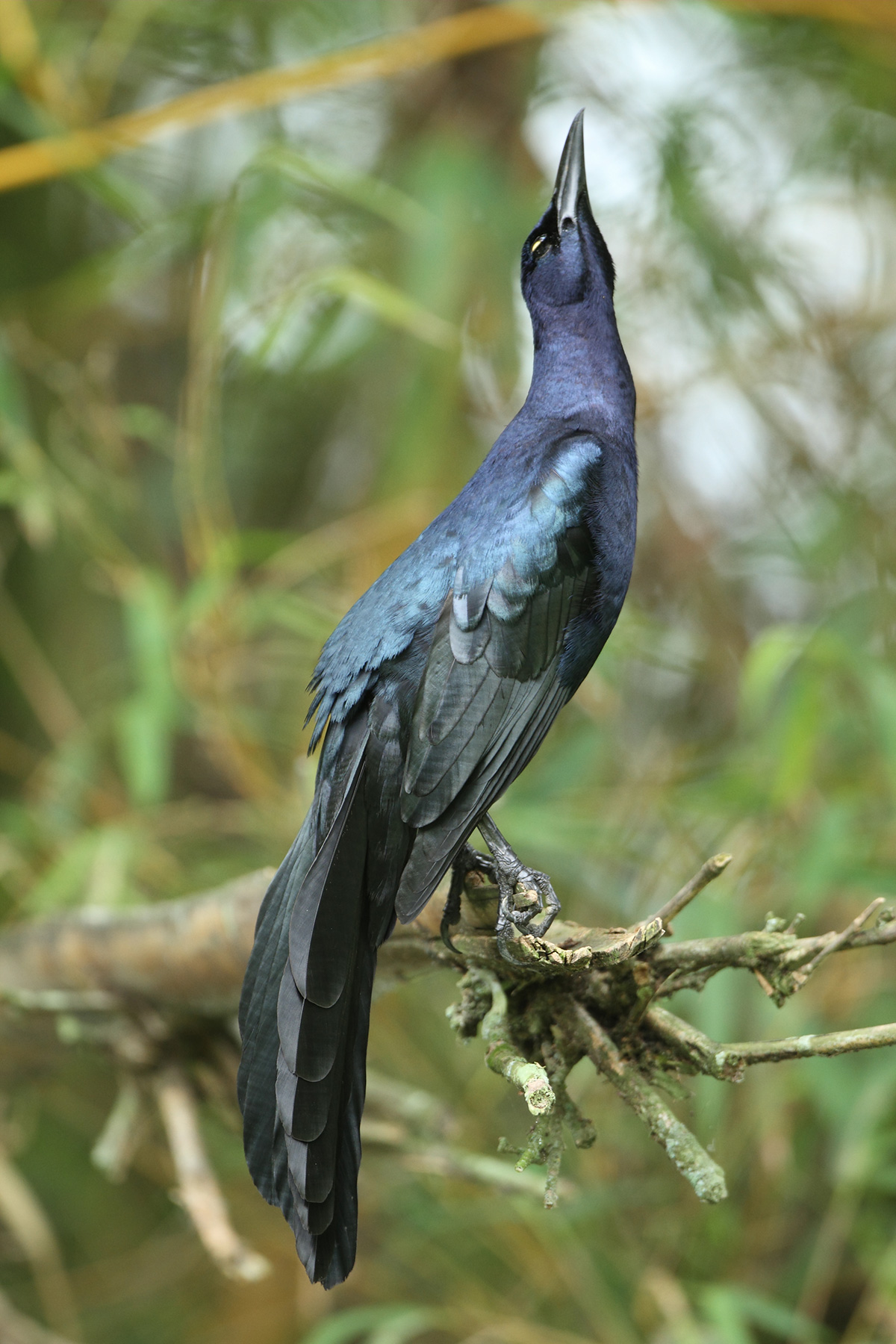
Breeding display by male in Costa Rica

Great-tailed grackles originated from the tropical lowlands of Central and South America, but historical evidence from Bernardino de Sahagún shows that the Aztecs, during the time of the emperor Ahuitzotl, introduced the great-tailed grackle from their homeland in the Mexican Gulf Coast to the Aztec capital of Tenochtitlan in the highland Valley of Mexico, most likely to use their iridescent feathers for decoration. In more recent times, great-tailed grackles expanded their breeding range by over 5,500% by moving north into North America between 1880 and 2000, following urban and agricultural corridors. Their current range stretches from northwestern Venezuela and western Colombia and Ecuador in the south to Minnesota in the north, to Oregon, Idaho, and California in the west, to Florida in the east, with vagrants occurring as far north as southern Canada. Their habitat for foraging is on the ground in clear areas such as pastures, wetlands and mangroves, and chaparral. The grackles' range has expanded with agricultural and urban settings.

== Behaviour and ecology ==
=== Behavior ===
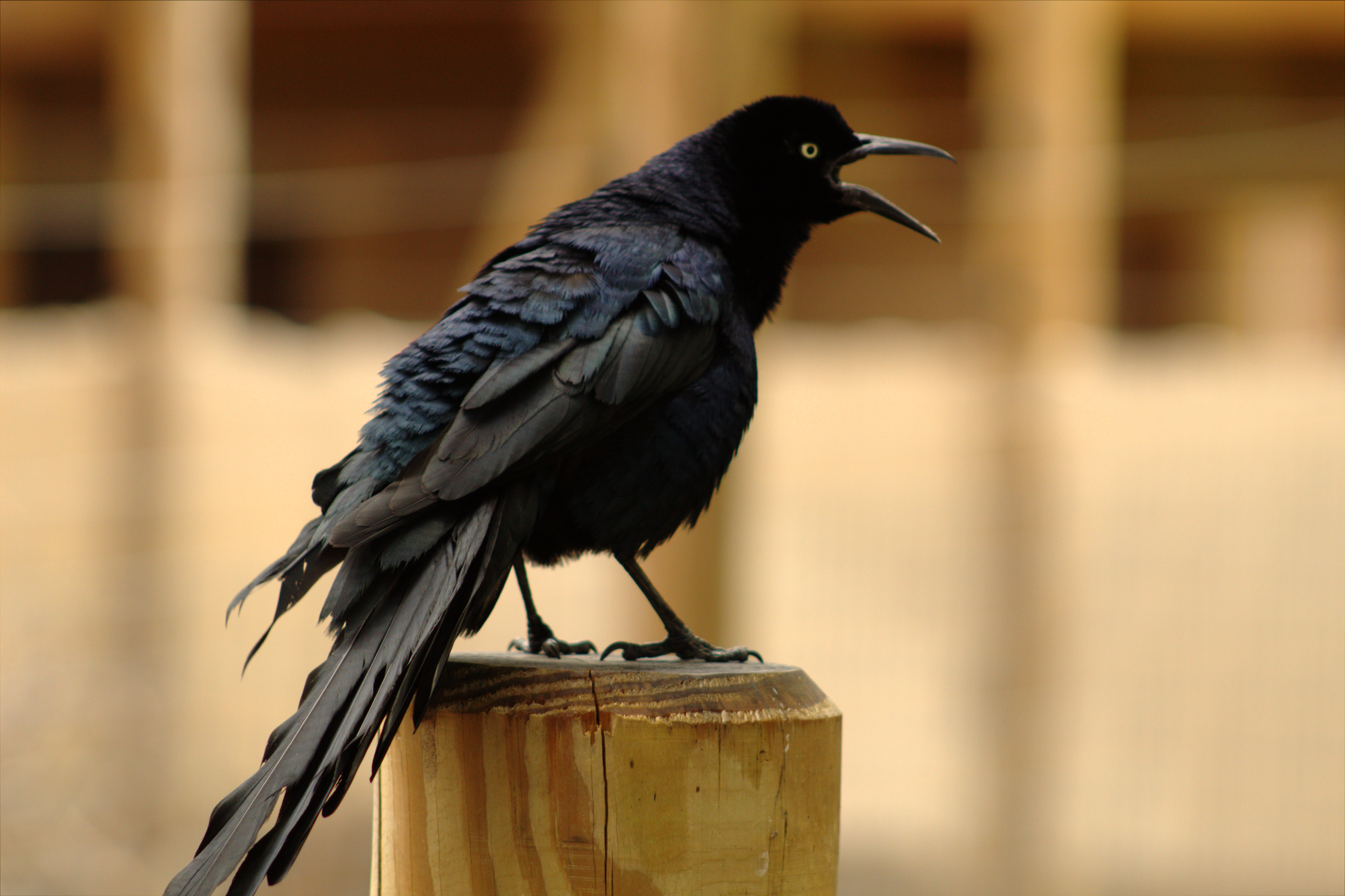
A male great-tailed grackle, making its distinctive call

Great-tailed grackles communally roost in trees or the reeds of wetlands at night and, during the breeding season, they nest in territories using three different mating strategies: 1) territorial males defend their territory on which many females place their nests and raise young, 2) residential males live in the larger colony but do not defend a territory or have mates, and 3) transient males stay for a few days before leaving the colony to likely move on to another colony. Resident and transient males sire a small number of offspring through extra-pair copulations with females on territories. Territorial males are heavier and have longer tails than non-territorial males, and both of these characteristics are associated with having more offspring.

Great-tailed grackles can solve The Crow and the Pitcher puzzle - a problem involving a tube that is partially filled with water and a floating, out-of-reach piece of food. The problem is solved by dropping objects into the water to raise the level and bring the food within reach. They are also behaviorally flexible, changing their preferences quickly in response to changes in cognitive tasks.

=== Breeding ===
The great-tailed grackle mating season usually begins in early or mid-April. The nest is typically built near the top of a large or medium-sized tree, using materials such as woven grass and twigs, as well as some man-made materials. Females usually lay around 4 to 7 eggs. Incubation is usually around 13 to 14 days and their young usually leave the nest 12 to 17 days after hatching; the parents continue to feed their young several weeks after they have left the nest until they reach maturity. Eggs are bright blue to pale bluish gray in color, marked with swirls and splotches that range from dark brown to black.

=== Food and feeding ===
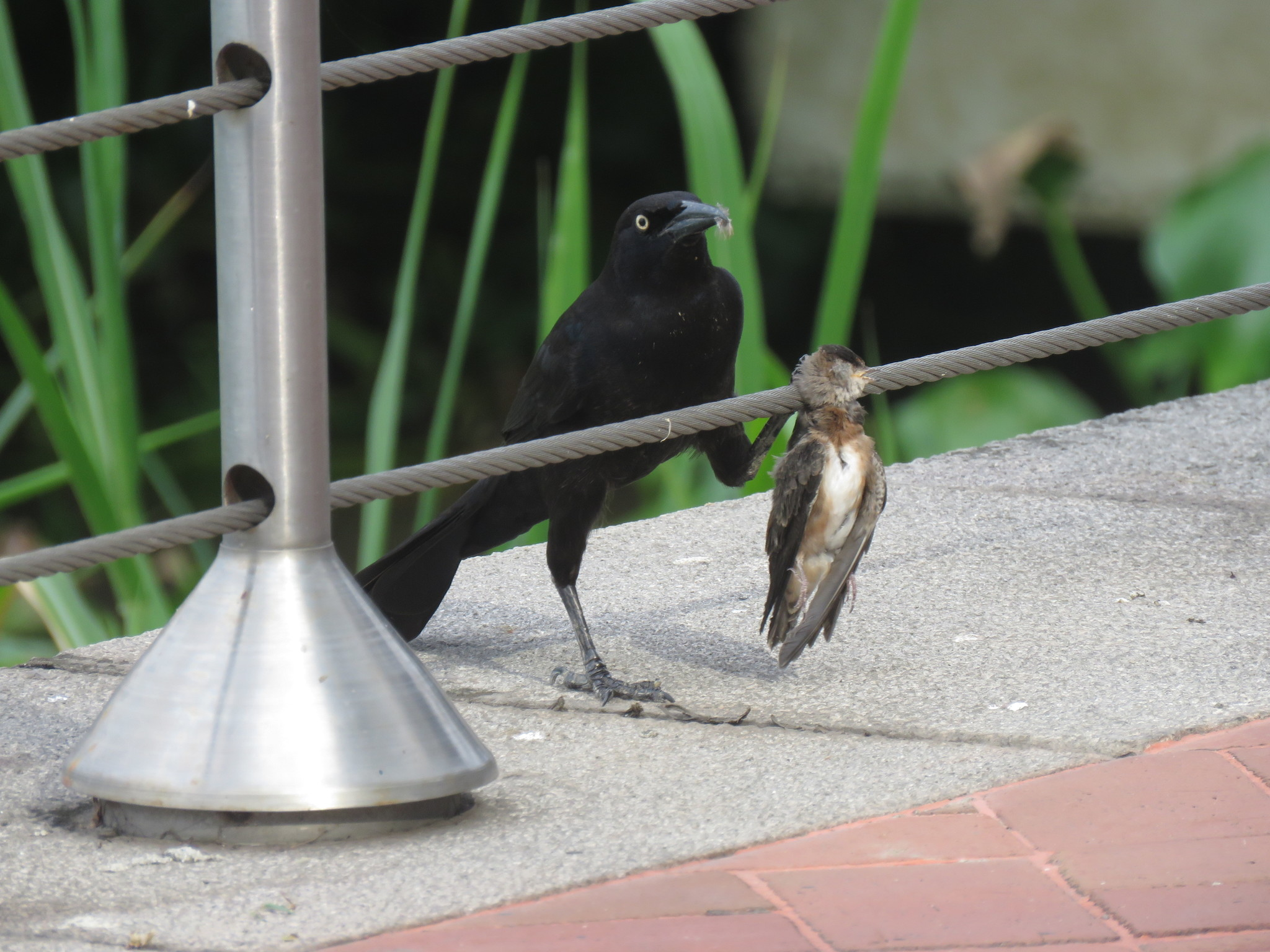
Eating a chestnut-collared swallow killed in a window strike

Great-tailed grackles are noted for their diverse foraging habits. They extract larvae and insects from grassy areas; eat lizards, nestlings, and eggs; forage in freshly plowed land; remove parasites from cattle, and eat fruits (e.g., bananas, berries) and grains (e.g., maize, corn on the cob by opening the husks). They turn over objects to search for food underneath, including crustaceans, insects, and worms; they hunt tadpoles and fish by wading into shallow water; and although they do not swim, they catch fish by flying close to the water's surface and diving a few inches into the water to retrieve a fish. They are also known to pick dead insects off the license plates of parked cars, and kill barn swallows while flying.

== In culture ==
Its introduction to the Valley of Mexico by Aztec Emperor Ahuitzotl between 1486–1502 is the earliest documented case of human-mediated introduction of a bird species to a new range in the Western Hemisphere. The account was documented in the Florentine Codex, making the account itself amongst the earliest peer-reviewed research in New World ornithology.

In Mexico, where it is known as the chanate or zanate, there is a legend that it has seven songs. "In the creation, the Zanate having no voice stole its seven distinct songs from the wise and knowing sea turtle. You can now hear the Zanate's vocals as the Seven Passions (Love, Hate, Fear, Courage, Joy, Sadness, and Anger) of life." Mexican artisans have created icons in clay, sometimes as whistles that portray the sea turtle with the zanate perched on its back.

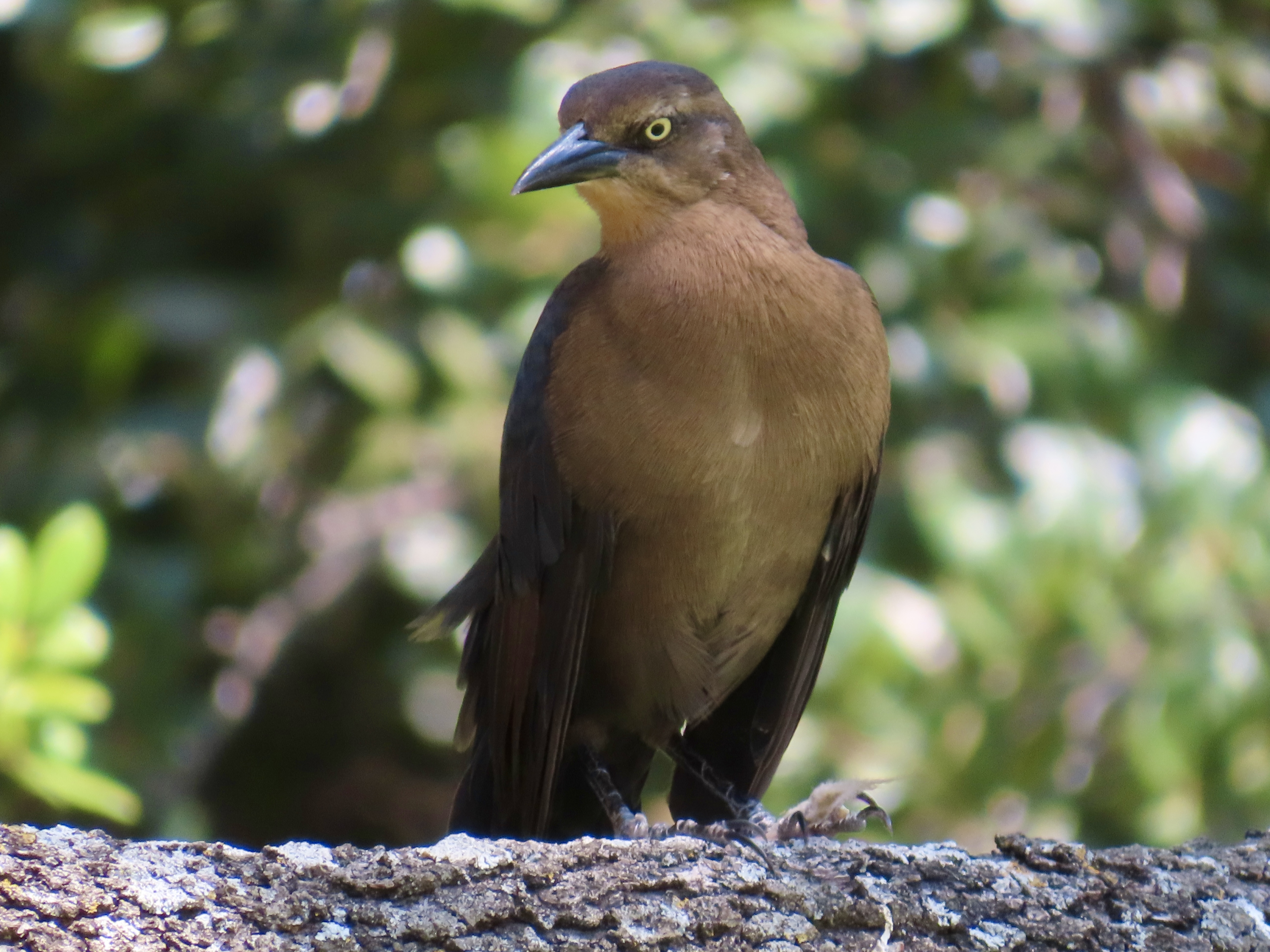
A female great-tailed grackle standing on a branch in Austin, Texas

In Colombia, the species is called the maria mulata, and is the official bird of Cartagena, Colombia. The Cartagena artist Enrique Grau had an affinity for these birds and, because of this inspiration, many Colombian monuments and artistic works were created in honor of the bird's intelligence, adaptability, cheerfulness, sociability, collaborative tendencies, diligence, craftiness, and ability to take advantage of adversity.

In Austin, Texas, it is commonly found congregating near the city's numerous food trucks, and grocery store parking lots. The great-tailed grackle has become an icon in the city, and especially on the campus of The University of Texas at Austin, to the extent that local radio station KUT offers grackle-themed socks as a popular gift for its supporters.
