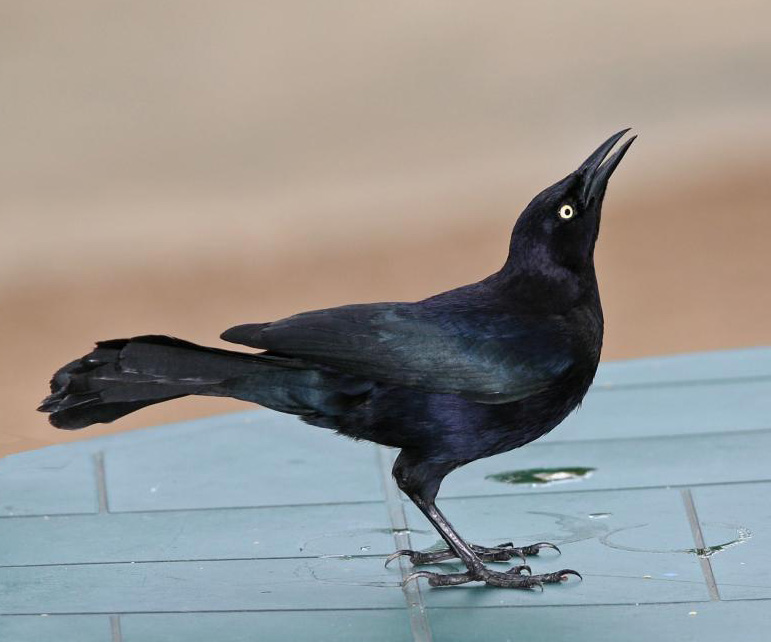
- Adult male Q. l. lugubris

Conservation status
- Least Concern (IUCN 3.1)

Scientific classification
- Kingdom: Animalia
- Phylum: Chordata
- Class: Aves
- Order: Passeriformes
- Family: Icteridae
- Genus: Quiscalus
- Species: Q. lugubris

Binomial name
- Quiscalus lugubris Swainson, 1838

= Carib grackle =

Species of bird

The Carib grackle (Quiscalus lugubris) is a species of bird in the family Icteridae, the oropendolas, New World orioles, and New World blackbirds. It is found throughout the Lesser Antilles, across northern South America from Colombia to extreme northeastern Brazil, and on several islands off South America's northern coast.

== Taxonomy and systematics ==
The Carib grackle was formally described in 1838 with its current binomial Quiscalus lugubris. For a time the Carib grackle and the Greater Antillean grackle (Q. niger) were placed in the genus Holoquiscalus; they now are believed to form a superspecies.

The Carib grackle has these eight subspecies:

- Q. l. guadeloupensis Lawrence, 1879
- Q. l. inflexirostris Swainson, 1838
- Q. l. luminosus Lawrence, 1878
- Q. l. orquillensis (Cory, 1909)
- Q. l. insularis Richmond, 1896
- Q. l. lugubris Swainson, 1838
- Q. l. contrusus (Peters, JL, 1925)
- Q. l. fortirostris Lawrence, 1868

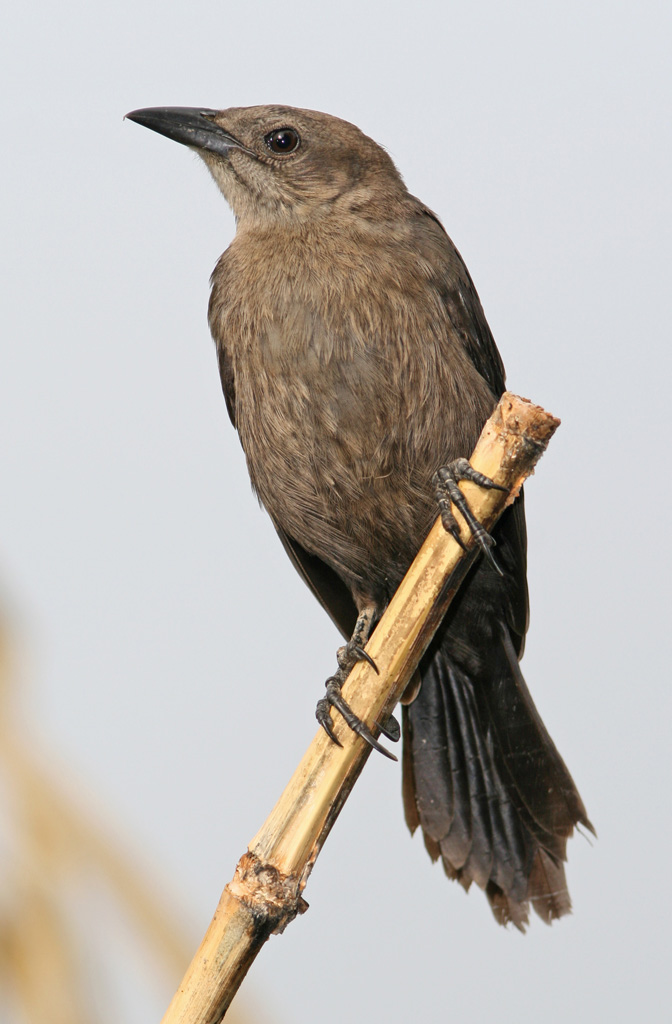
Immature female Q. l. insularis

== Description ==
Male Carib grackles average 26 cm (10 in) long and females about 22 cm (8.7 in). Males weigh 66 to 80 g (2.3 to 2.8 oz) and females 49 to 58 g (1.7 to 2.0 oz). Males of all subspecies have a long keel-shaped ("V") tail; females' tails are shorter and flat. Adult males of the nominate subspecies Q. l. lugubris are completely black with a violet gloss on most of the body; it is slightly less strong on the underparts. The gloss is more violet-blue on the wing coverts and greener on the flight feathers. Adult females have dull dark brownish upperparts that is darkest on the wings and tail; their underparts are a lighter brownish and their throat grayer and paler still. Adults of both sexes have a yellow iris, a black bill, and black legs and feet. Juvenile males are dark brown and juvenile females a warmer brown. Both have a dark iris which females retain longer than males.

The other subspecies of the Carib grackle differ from the nominate and each other thus:

- Q. l. guadeloupensis: shorter, thicker bill; male has violet gloss that is greener on the wing; female is palest subspecies, with buff lores and supercilium, pale brown upperparts, whitish chin and throat, and light buffish underparts with darker streaks
- Q. l. inflexirostris: slightly larger with slightly larger bill than guadeloupensis; male like guadeloupensis; female has lighter supercilium, brown upperparts with darker rump, blackish wings and tail with paler feather edges, paler throat, and buff-brown underparts with grayer flanks
- Q. l. contrusus: male like guadeloupensis and inflexirostris; female is darkest subspecies, blackish brown overall
- Q. l. fortirostris: smallest subspecies; short thick bill; female slightly lighter than contrusus
- Q. l. luminosus: longest and thinnest bill; male similar to guadeloupensis with more extensive violet gloss; female slightly paler than fortirostris with paler throat and browner underparts; juvenile most heavily streaked subspecies
- Q. l. insularis: slightly smaller than nominate but with longer wings and tail; male less glossy
- Q. l. orquillensis: male like insularis but with green gloss on most of tail; female intermediate between luminosus and insularis

== Distribution and habitat ==
The subspecies of the Carib grackle are found thus:

- Q. l. guadeloupensis: Lesser Antilles from Montserrat south to Martinique
- Q. l. inflexirostris: Saint Lucia in the central Lesser Antilles
- Q. l. contrusus: Saint Vincent in the southern Lesser Antilles
- Q. l. luminosus: the Grenadines and Grenada in the southern Lesser Antilles and Los Testigos Islands off northeastern Venezuela
- Q. l. orquillensis: Los Hermanos Archipelago off northern Venezuela
- Q. l. insularis: Margarita Island and Los Frailes Archipelago off northeastern Venezuela
- Q. l. lugubris: from east-central Colombia's Meta Department north to the Guajira Peninsula and east across most of northern Venezuela; Trinidad and Tobago; across coastal Guyana, Suriname, and French Guiana into far northeastern Brazil's Amapá state; and the ABC islands (and see below)
- Q. l. fortirostris: Barbados in the southern Lesser Antilles; introduced to Barbuda and Antigua in the northern Lesser Antilles

The nominate subspecies occurs naturally on Trinidad but is believed to have been introduced from there to Tobago. Its origin on the ABC islands (whether by vagrancy or introduction) is not known.

The Carib grackle inhabits a variety of open landscapes including scrublands, open woodland, pastures, plantations and palm groves, parks and gardens, and suburban and urban areas including large cities. In elevation it is found below 500 m (1,600 ft) in Colombia, below 850 m (2,800 ft) in Venezuela, and below 300 m (1,000 ft) in Brazil.

== Behavior ==
=== Movement ===
The Carib grackle is overall a year-round resident but in the Venezuelan Llanos is thought to make local movements in response to seasonal changes.

=== Feeding ===
The Carib grackle is "opportunistic and omnivorous". Its diet includes insects and other arthropods, small vertebrates like lizards, eggs and chicks of small birds, seeds, and fruits. It has also been observed catching fish, frogs, and (on the wing) bats. It forages mostly on the ground in flocks that may often include other icterids. In human-inhabited areas it feeds on food scraps and has been known to enter restaurants. It is "[u]sually seen in boisterous groups that are conspic[uous] around ranch buildings in [the] countryside and in plazas and residential areas in towns where they become practically pensioners of people".

=== Breeding ===
The Carib grackle breeds almost year-round. Activity is concentrated between May and September in Trinidad and in June and July in the Llanos. It is generally monogamous but sometimes possibly polygynous. It nests solitarily or in small colonies; a tree may hold a dozen nests. Pairs display to each other and rivals by raising and spreading their tail and shaking their open wings. Females build the deep cup nest from grass, other plant fibers, and mud lined with fine fibers. Nest can be up to about 15 m (50 ft) above the ground though some in marshy areas or on shores are only about 2 m (7 ft) above water. The clutch is two to four eggs that are greenish blue with blackish brown and gray markings. The female alone incubates for about 12 days and fledging occurs about 14 days after hatch. Both parents provision nestlings. In the llanos the shiny cowbird (Molothrus bonariensis) is a significant brood parasite but in Trinidad females appear to reject most cowbird eggs.

=== Vocalization ===
The Carib grackle's song varies among the subspecies but is "generally a series of squeaky notes". In the Antilles its vocalization is generally "3-7 syllables with rising inflection" and also "whistles and chucks". On Martinique it makes "a descending, Molothrus-like whistle followed by a complex warble" and on Trinidad "a series of rhythmic rattles ending in metallic sound". In Venezuela its most common call is "a loud, ringing, bouncy queek-queek-queek-queek, often over and over". It also makes "a loud descending keerr and other loud ringing, twittering, and chucking calls".

== Status ==
The IUCN has assessed the Carib grackle as being of Least Concern. It has a large range; its population size is not known but is believed to be stable. No immediate threats have been identified. It is considered common on most of the Lesser Antilles but is harder to find on Saint Vincent, Dominica, and Montserrat. It is locally common in Colombia and Venezuela and "frequent to uncommon" in its small Brazilian range.
