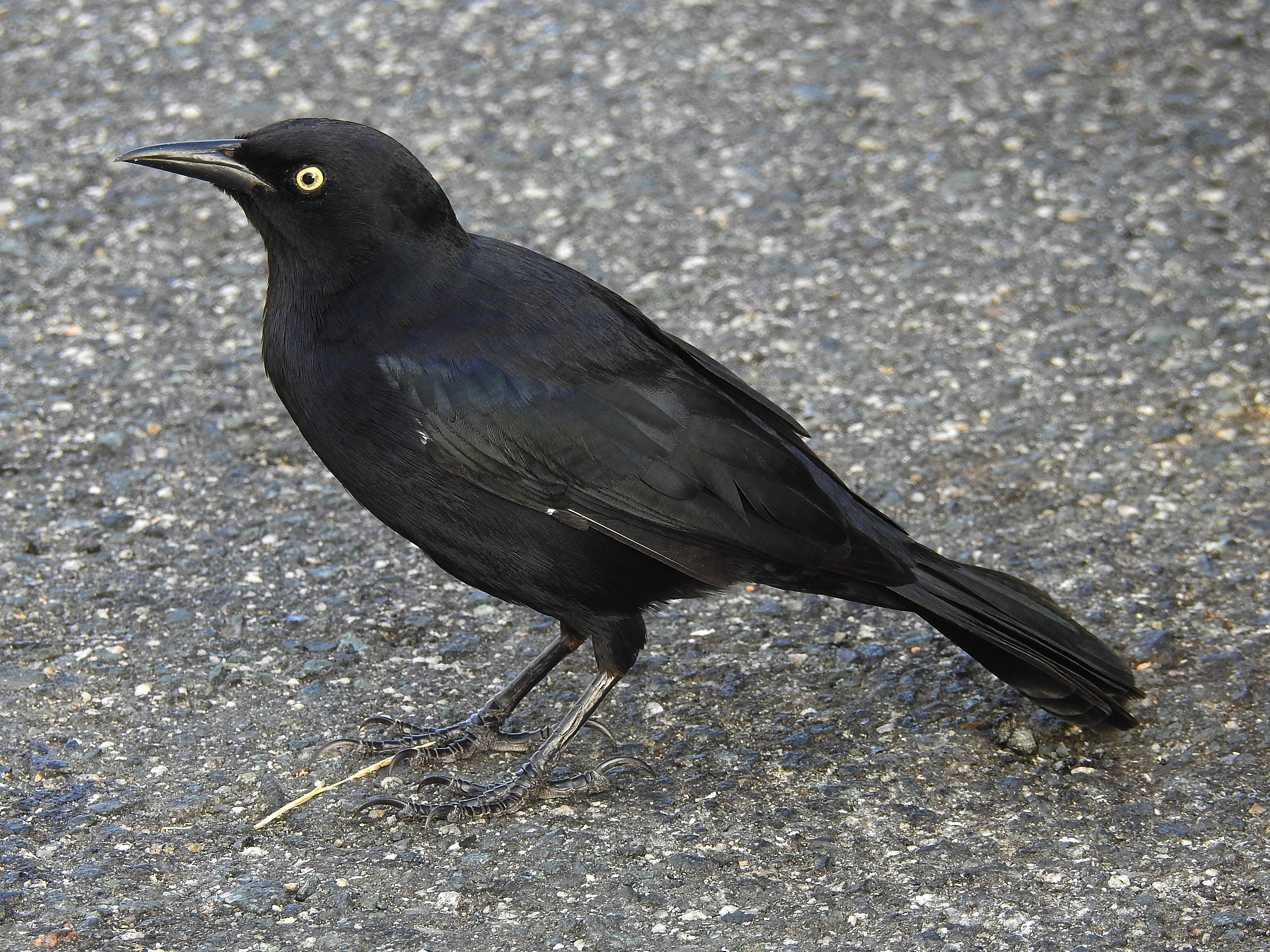
- Q. n. gundlachii in Cayo Coco, Cuba

Conservation status
- Least Concern (IUCN 3.1)

Scientific classification
- Kingdom: Animalia
- Phylum: Chordata
- Class: Aves
- Order: Passeriformes
- Family: Icteridae
- Genus: Quiscalus
- Species: Q. niger

Binomial name
- Quiscalus niger (Boddaert, 1783)
- Range of Q. niger

= Greater Antillean grackle =

Species of bird

The Greater Antillean grackle (Quiscalus niger) is a species of bird in the family Icteridae, the oropendolas, New World orioles, and New World blackbirds. It is found in the Greater Antilles from Cuba to Puerto Rico and in the Cayman Islands southwest of Cuba.

== Taxonomy and systematics ==
The Irish physician, naturalist and collector Hans Sloane stayed in Jamaica between 1687 and 1689. During his visit, he collected specimens and made notes on the plants and animals. Based on these notes, the ornithologist John Ray published a short description of the Greater Antillean grackle in 1713, using the Latin name Monedula tota nigra but it was not until 1725, more than 35 years after his visit, that Sloane himself published a description of the grackle. He reported that it was common on the road between St. Jago de la Vega (Spanish Town) and Passage-Fort (Portmore).

In 1775 the French polymath Georges-Louis Leclerc, Comte de Buffon described the Greater Antillean grackle in his Histoire Naturelle des Oiseaux. The bird was also illustrated in a hand-colored plate engraved by François-Nicolas Martinet in the Planches Enluminées D'Histoire Naturelle which was produced under the supervision of Edme-Louis Daubenton to accompany Buffon's text. Neither the plate caption nor Buffon's description included a scientific name but in 1783 the Dutch naturalist Pieter Boddaert coined the binomial Oriolus niger in his catalogue of the Planches Enluminées. Buffon's specimen was probably collected in the French colony of Saint-Domingue which occupied the western end of Hispaniola (what is now Haiti). In 1921 the American ornithologist James L. Peters restricted the type locality to Port-au-Prince in Haiti.

The Greater Antillean grackle is now one of seven species in the genus Quiscalus, one of which is extinct. That genus had been introduced by the French ornithologist Louis Pierre Vieillot in 1816. The genus name is from the specific name Gracula quiscula coined by the Swedish naturalist Carl Linnaeus for the common grackle; the specific epithet niger is Latin for "black".

For a time the Greater Antillean grackle and the Carib grackle (Q. lugubris) were placed in the genus Holoquiscalus; they now are believed to form a superspecies.

The Greater Antillean grackle has these seven subspecies:

- Q. n. caribaeus (Todd, 1916)
- Q. n. gundlachii Cassin, 1867
- Q. n. caymanensis Cory, 1886
- Q. n. bangsi (Peters, JL, 1921)
- Q. n. crassirostris Swainson, 1838
- Q. n. niger (Boddaert, 1783)
- Q. n. brachypterus Cassin, 1867

== Local names ==
Most local names seem to derive from onomatopoeiac descriptions of the Greater Antillean grackle's vocalizations. In Haitian Creole it is called "mèl diab", in Cuba "chichinguaco", in the Dominican Republic "chinchilín", and in Puerto Rico "Mozambique". It is known as the "kling-kling" in Jamaica and as "ching ching" in the Cayman Islands.

== Description ==
The Greater Antillean grackle is 25 to 30 cm (9.8 to 12 in) long. Males weigh about 67 to 100 g (2.4 to 3.5 oz) except those of Q. n. crassirostris which average 112 g (4.0 oz). Females weigh about 50 to 72 g (1.8 to 2.5 oz) except those of Q. n. crassirostris which average 79 g (2.8 oz). Males have a long graduated tail which it holds in a "V" shape; females' tails are shorter and held flat. Adults of both sexes of all subspecies are entirely black; males are glossy and most females are less so. The nominate subspecies Q. n. niger is the smallest. Nominate males have a purple gloss on their head and upperparts and a greenish gloss on their flight feathers and tail.

The other subspecies of the Greater Antillean grackle differ from the nominate and each other thus:

- Q. n. caribaeus: males have a bluish gloss
- Q. n. gundlachii: both sexes have a violaceous gloss
- Q. n. caymanensis: males have purplish-blue gloss on the head and upperparts, greenish blue gloss on the uppertail coverts, and bronze-green gloss on the wings
- Q. n. crassirostris: males have violet gloss on head and upperparts, blue gloss on upper- and undertail coverts, and greenish bronze gloss on upperwing coverts
- Q. n. bangsi: males have bluer gloss than crassirostris; females are brownish
- Q. n. brachypterus: like crassirostris but for purple gloss on uppertail coverts

Adults of all subspecies have a yellow iris, a black bill, and black legs and feet. Juveniles of all subspecies are brownish black with no gloss and have dark brown eyes.

== Distribution and habitat ==
The subspecies of the Greater Antillean grackle are found thus:

- Q. n. caribaeus: Pinar del Río Province in far western Cuba, on Isla de Juventud (Isle of Pines), and nearby cays
- Q. n. gundlachii: Cuba except Pinar del Río Province, Jardines de la Reina off the southern coast, and cays off the northern coast
- Q. n. caymanensis: Grand Cayman
- Q. n. bangsi: Little Cayman; extirpated from Cayman Brac
- Q. n. crassirostris: Jamaica
- Q. n. niger: Hispaniola (shared by Haiti and the Dominican Republic)
- Q. n. brachypterus: Puerto Rico including Vieques

The Greater Antillean grackle inhabits a variety of landscapes, most of which are open. These include savanna, pastures and cultivated areas, light woodlands, scrublands, marshes, mangroves, and parks and gardens in human-inhabited areas. It "often roosts in towns and cities" and several thousand may roost together. Sources differ on its elevational range. One simply says "lowlands". Another says it ranges from sea level to 1,800 m (5,900 ft). A third says that the nominate subspecies is mostly below 1,000 m (3,300 ft) but as high as 2,200 m (7,200 ft) while Q. n. crassirostris is mostly in the lowlands; the source does not address the other subspecies.

== Behavior ==
=== Movement ===
The Greater Antillean grackle is a year-round resident, though some local movements to find fruiting trees have been noted in Jamaica.

=== Feeding ===
The Greater Antillean grackle is omnivorous. Common foods include insects and other arthropods, wild and domestic fruits and seeds, small vertebrates like lizards, and the eggs and chicks of small birds. It regularly forages in flocks.

=== Breeding ===
The Greater Antillean grackle breeds between February and September. Most activity is between April and early August overall but between March and July in Cuba. The species breeds colonially and colonies of up to 30 nests have been noted in mangrove forest. Its nest is an open cup made from plant fibers and mud lined with fine fibers and usually placed in a mangrove or palm. Nests in Cuba have been found between about 5 and 16 m (15 and 50 ft) above the ground. The clutch is three to four eggs that are pale olive to brown with black markings. The incubation period is not known; fledging occurs at least 23 days after hatch. Most details of parental care are not known but males have been observed provisioning nestlings. The shiny cowbird (Molothrus bonariensis) is reported to be a brood parasite in Puerto Rico but apparently to only a minor extent.

=== Vocalization ===
The Greater Antillean grackle's song varies greatly among the subspecies "but (for a grackle) is relatively musical". Songs have been described as "a metallic cling-cling-cling and flute-like whistles". Its calls include "chuk or chuk-chuk or chin-chin-chilin [and] high wee-si-si and harsh notes".

== Status ==
The IUCN has assessed the Greater Antillean grackle as being of Least Concern. It has a very large range; its population size is not known but is believed to be stable. No immediate threats have been identified. One source considers it common throughout its range and another calls it "common to abundant".

== Gallery ==
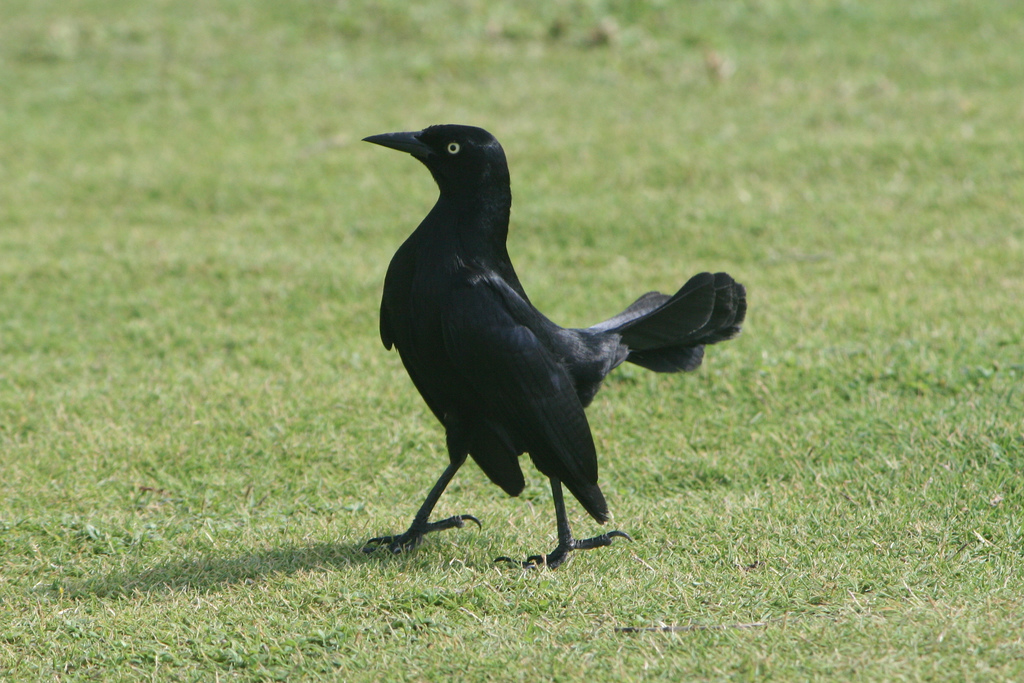
In Puerto Rico

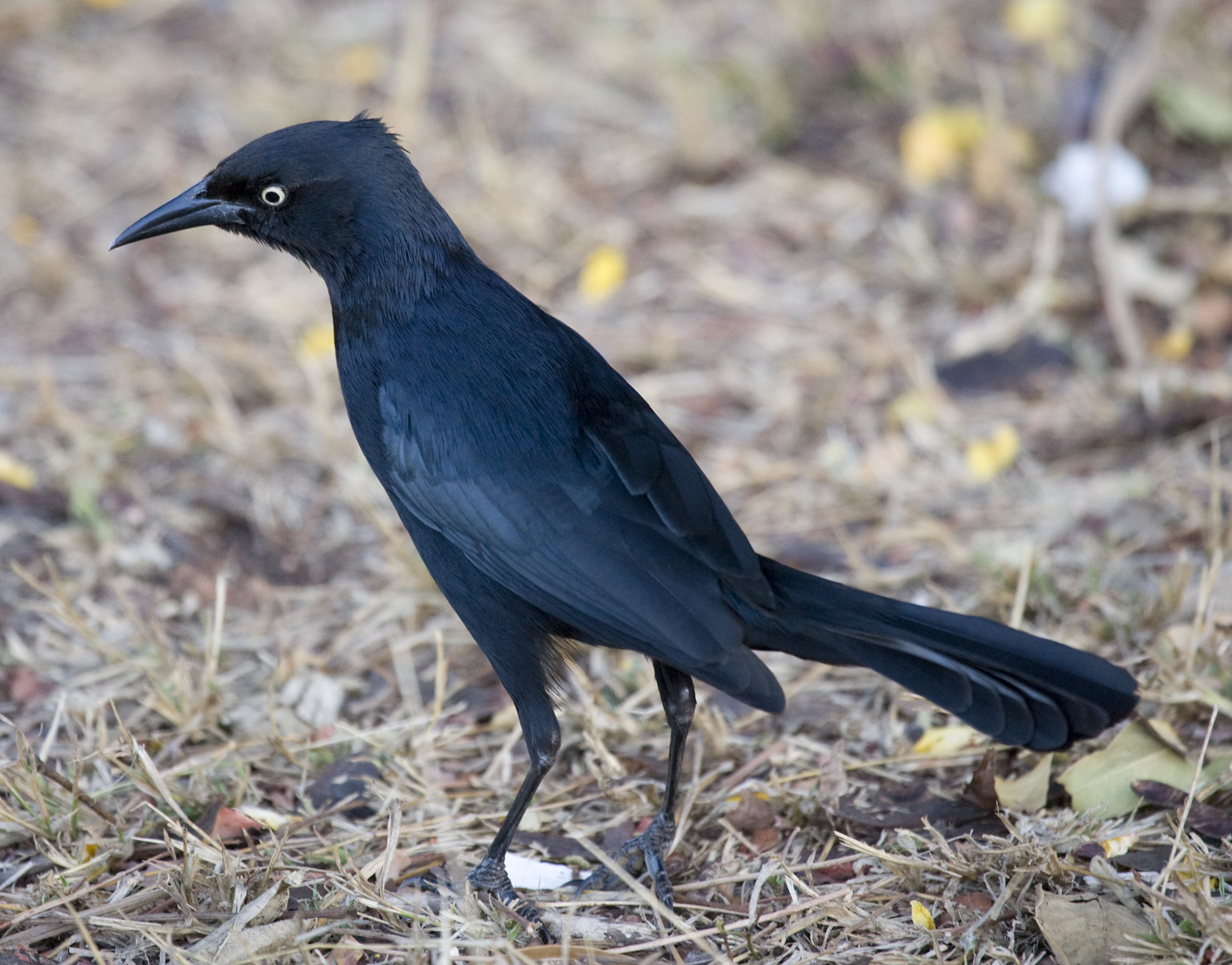
In Cuba

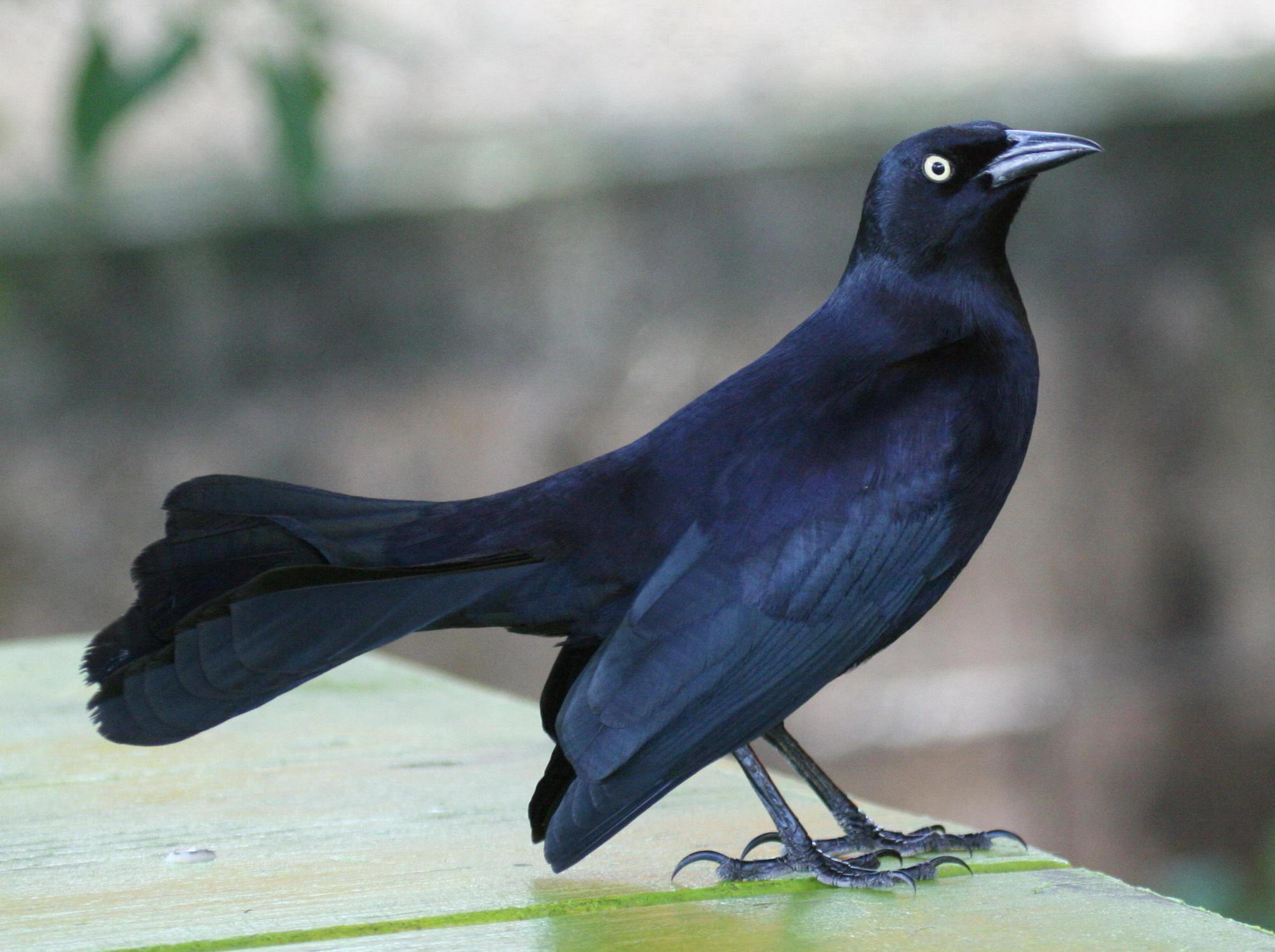
In Puerto Rico

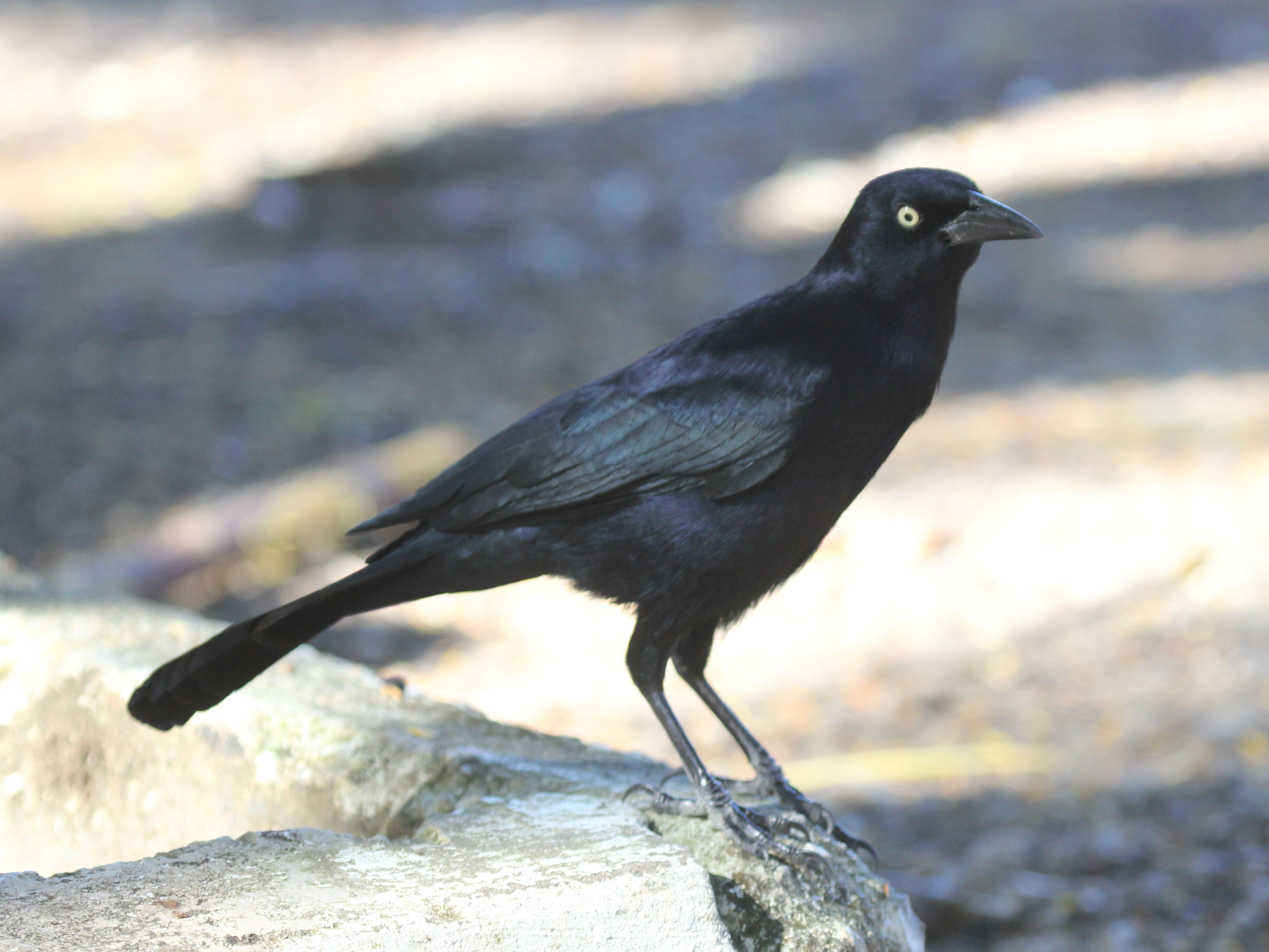
In Jamaica

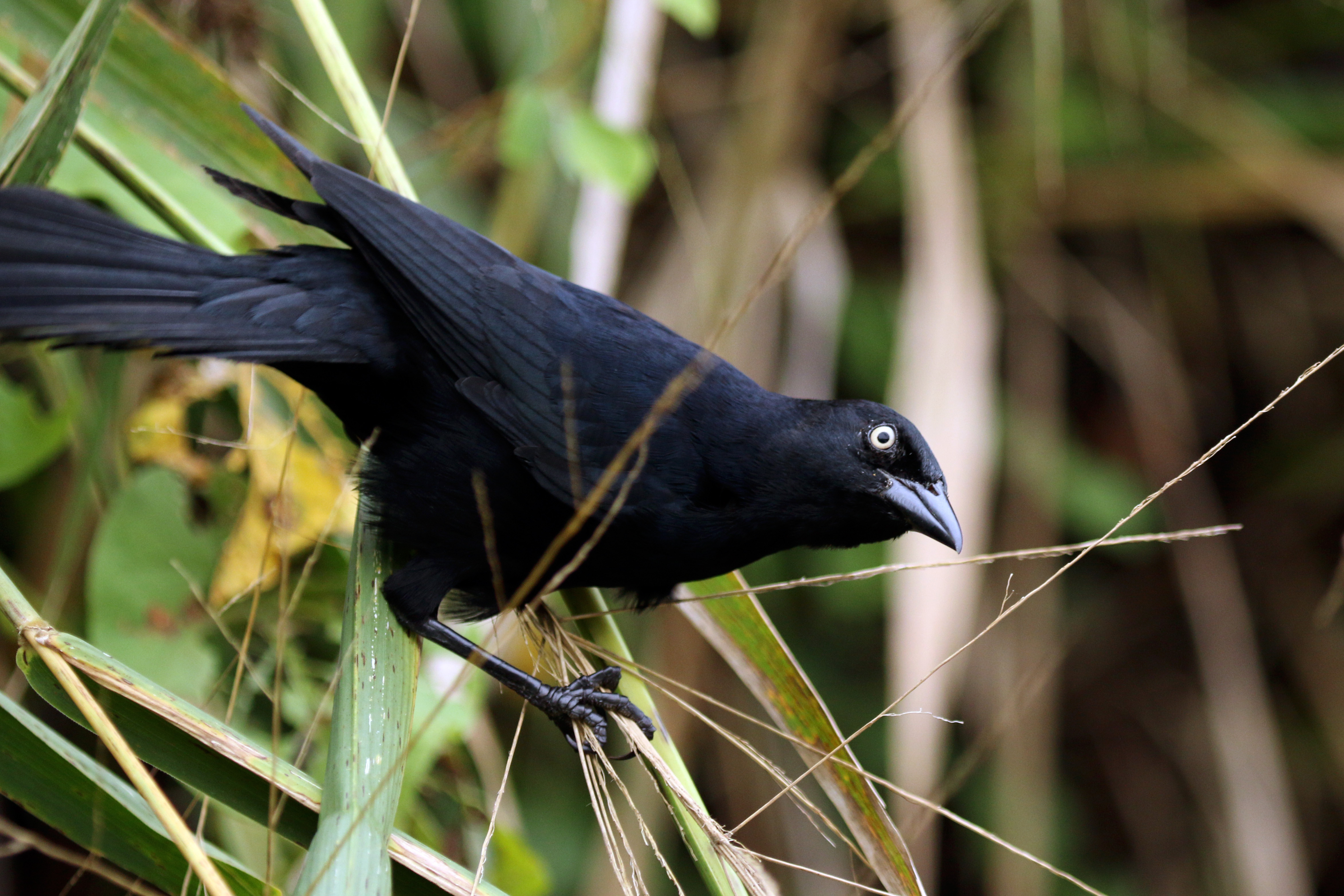
In Jamaica

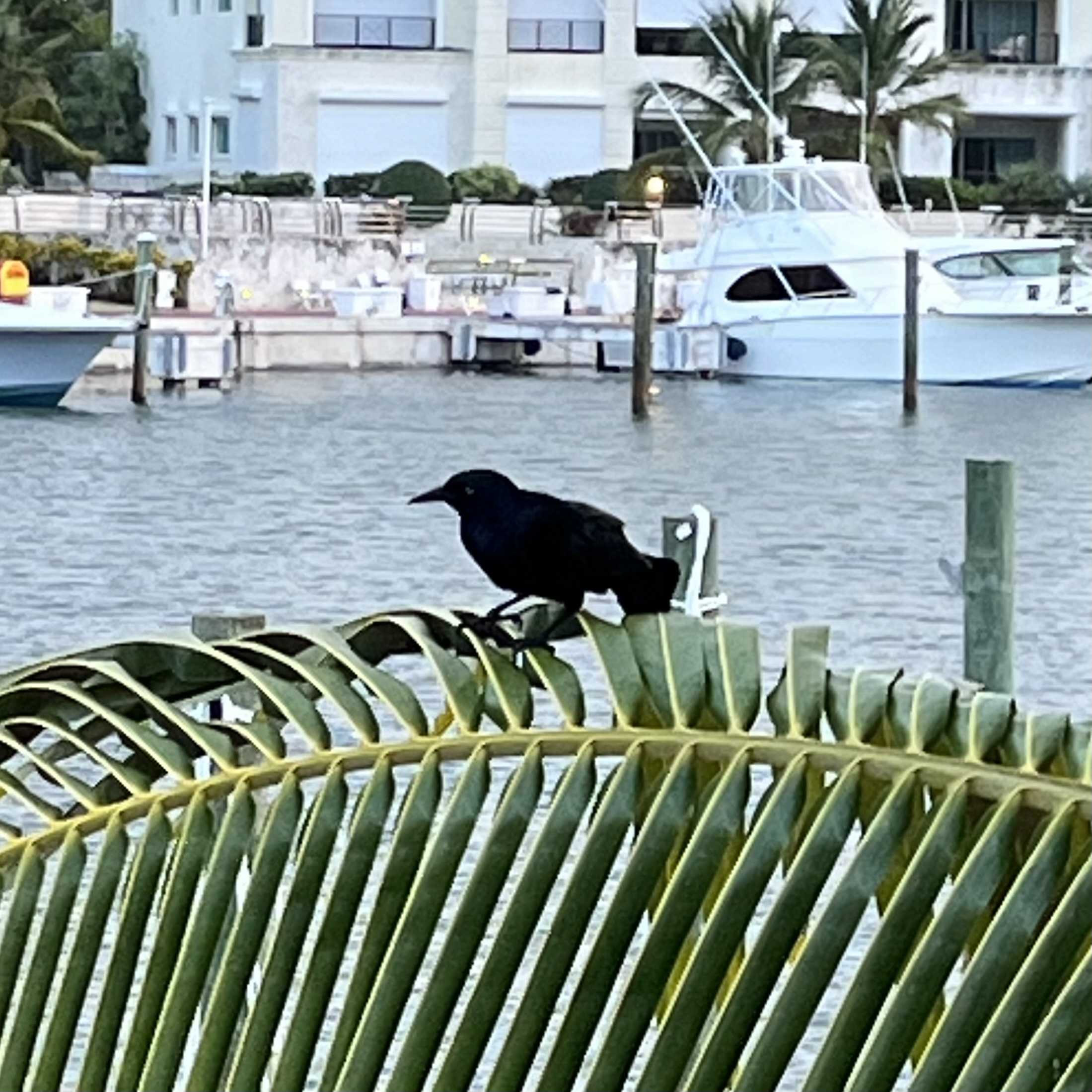
In the Dominican Republic

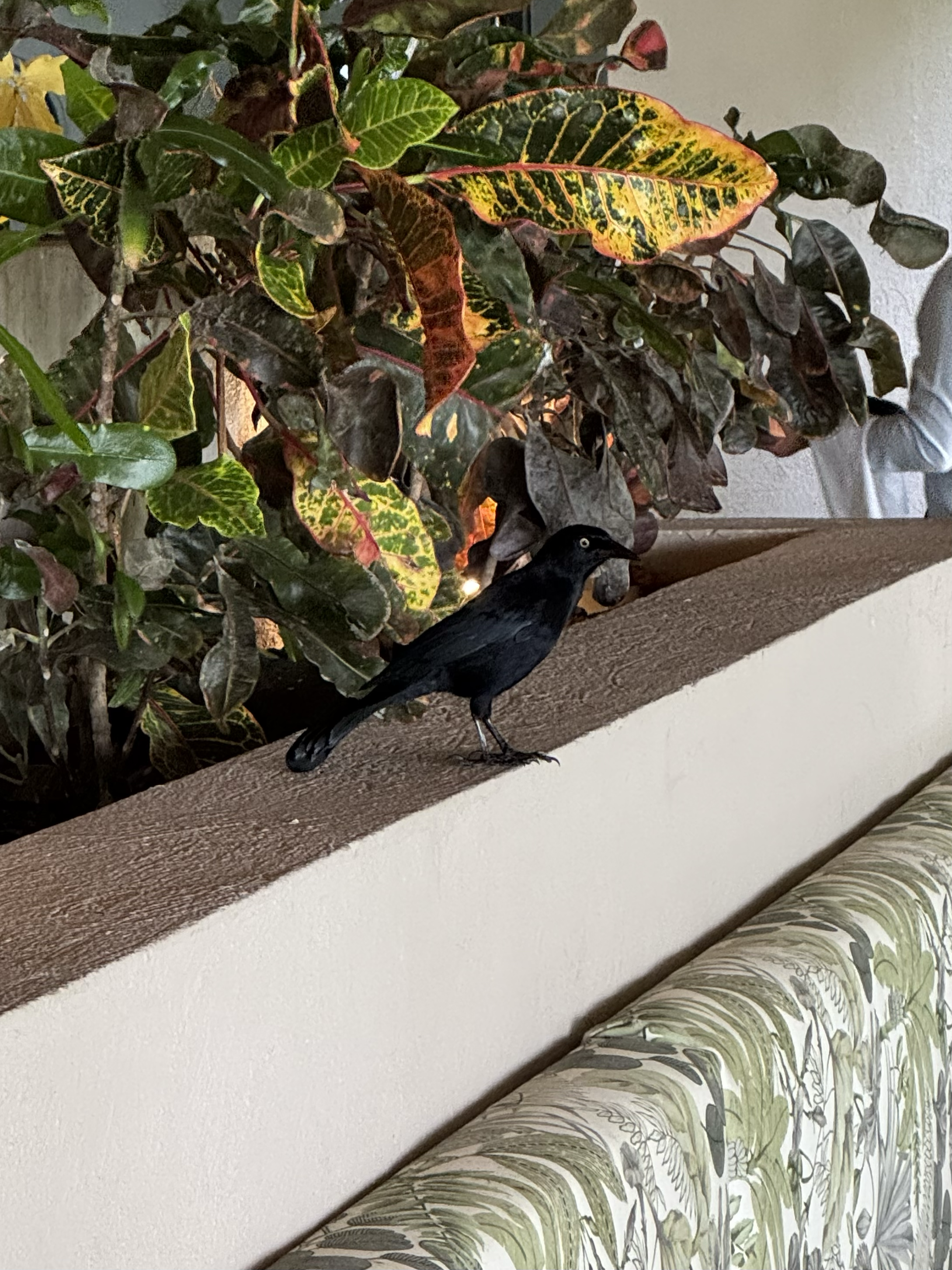
In the Dominican Republic

== See also ==
- Fauna of Puerto Rico
- List of birds of Puerto Rico
- List of birds of Vieques
