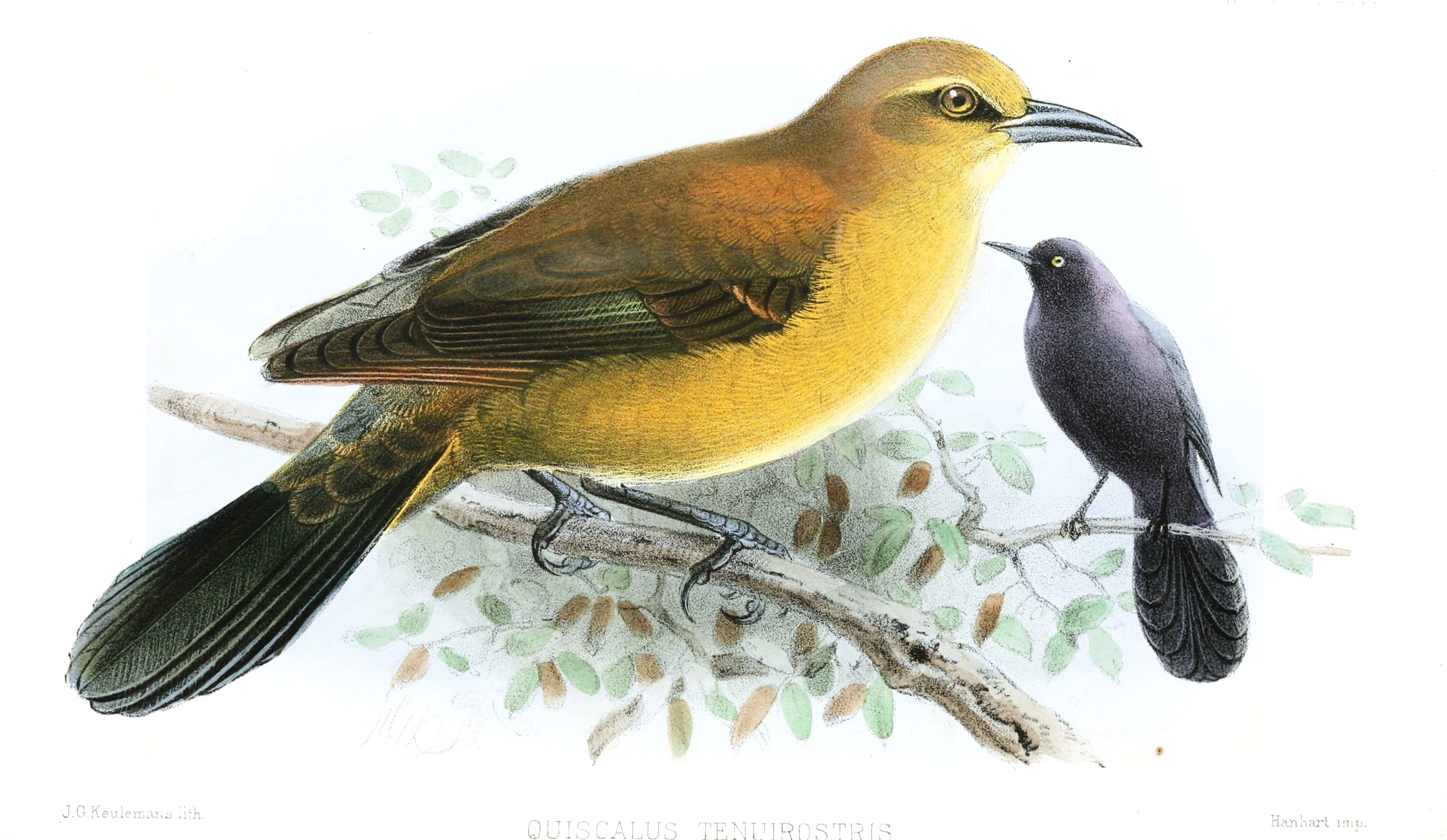

Conservation status
- Extinct (1910) (IUCN 3.1)

Scientific classification
- Kingdom: Animalia
- Phylum: Chordata
- Class: Aves
- Order: Passeriformes
- Family: Icteridae
- Genus: Quiscalus
- Species: †Q. palustris

Binomial name
- †Quiscalus palustris (Swainson, 1827)
- The range of the slender-billed grackle, in Mexico

= Slender-billed grackle =

Extinct species of bird

The slender-billed grackle (Quiscalus palustris) is an extinct species of grackle in the Icteridae (New World blackbirds) family of birds. The species was closely related to the western clade of the great-tailed grackle, from which it diverged quite recently, around 1.2 million years ago. It weighed 2.5 oz to 5 oz.

The slender-billed grackle was endemic to central Mexico, especially in the Valley of Mexico and the Toluca Valley. Early observations recorded by Franciscan friar Bernardino de Sahagún in the 16th-century manuscript General History of the Things of New Spain indicate that the species was found in cultivated areas and towns. Later records indicated that it might be a marsh specialist. The species became extinct around the turn of the 20th century.

== Habitat ==
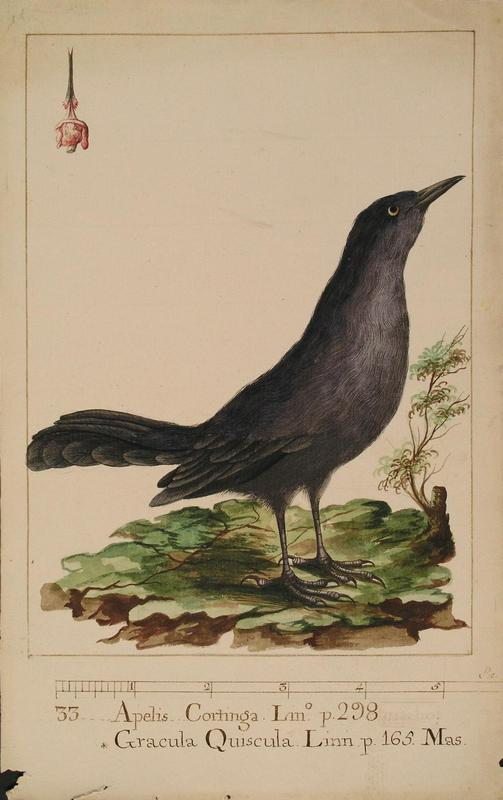
Male by José Mariano Mociño

Marsh from both The Valley of Mexico and The Valley of Toluca.

The slender-billed grackle was originally known from the Rio Lerma area in Mexico. It has not been recorded since 1910. Several records of the slender-billed grackle are known from three different habitats, such as wetlands, cultivated plots, and human settlements. Slender-billed grackles inhabited marshes and borders of the lakes. Emergent aquatic vegetation was commonly used for nesting material by the slender-billed grackles.

=== Nesting ===
The slender-billed grackle usually nested in marshes and aquatic vegetation; however, as the population in Mexico increased, the species was able to adapt to the changes in the environment and learned to nest in towns and cultivated plots. The slender-billed grackle hatched its eggs in reeds.

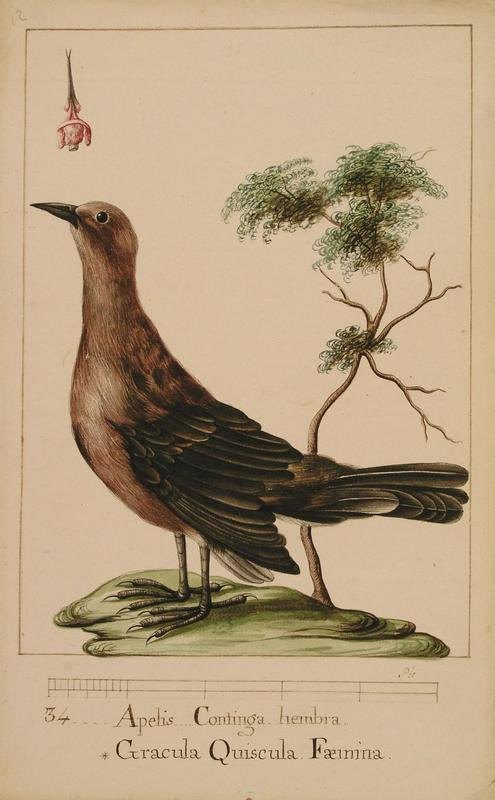
Female

=== Diet and Behavior ===
The diet of the slender-billed grackle consisted of animals, plants, and fruits. It mainly ate worms, flies, and maize. The slender-billed grackle also tended to group and form flocks. The males would proclaim their breeding territory by noisy displays.

=== Human interaction ===
When the initial European settlers came to central Mexico, they observed that the Aztecs targeted the slender-billed grackle; the reason for this is partially unclear. Some speculate that they were targeted because they were seen as pests that ate their crops, while others believe it was to use their feathers for headdresses. They chose to use their black tail feathers rather than their bright green feathers for reasons still unknown.

Also during Izcalli, the Aztecs' month in which they sacrificed a variety of animals to their gods, they chose to use this bird for sacrifice to their fire god. The reason for this is not yet known to historians, but many believe it was because they were abundant and considered a nuisance.

== Extinction ==
The slender-billed grackle is believed to have become extinct around the turn of the 20th century, after disappearing from the Valley of Mexico. The only known habitats for the slender-billed grackle were the marshes and wetlands of Mexico. Reports of grackles nesting in urban areas also exist, but this is believed to have been a response to the loss of habitat due to the conversion of marshes to farmland. Slender-billed grackles had also been observed nesting in cultivated farmland near towns, but much of this land was cultivated marshland.

Slender-billed grackles had also been hunted extensively by local populations for use in rituals. The grackles were collected in areas near the towns, as they were gathered the day before rituals were to be held.
