= List of birds of Nicaragua =

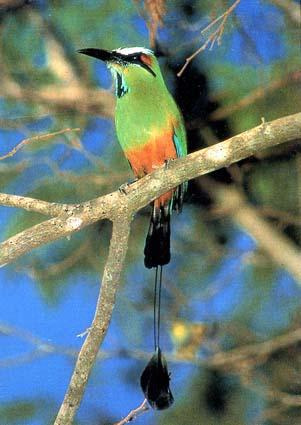
The guardabarranco (turquoise-browed motmot) is Nicaragua's national bird.

This is a list of the bird species recorded in Nicaragua. The avifauna of Nicaragua included a total of 788 species as of May 2023, according to Bird Checklists of the World. Of them, 142 are rare or accidental and five have been introduced by humans. None are endemic. An additional accidental species has been added from another source.

This list is presented in the taxonomic sequence of the Check-list of North and Middle American Birds, 7th edition through the 63rd Supplement, published by the American Ornithological Society (AOS). Common and scientific names are also those of the Check-list, except that the common names of families are from the Clements taxonomy because the AOS list does not include them.

Unless otherwise noted, the species on this list are considered to occur regularly in Nicaragua as permanent residents, summer or winter visitors, or migrants. The following tags have been used to highlight several categories. The tags and notes of population status are from Bird Checklists of the World.

- (A) Accidental - a species that rarely or accidentally occurs in Nicaragua
- (I) Introduced - a species introduced to Nicaragua as a consequence, direct or indirect, of human actions

== Tinamous ==
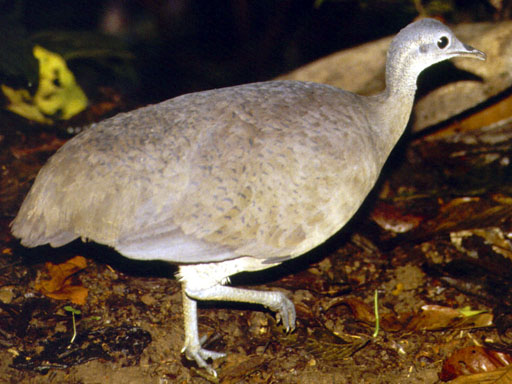
Great tinamou

Order: Tinamiformes Family: Tinamidae

The tinamous are one of the most ancient groups of bird. Although they look similar to other ground-dwelling birds like quail and grouse, they have no close relatives and are classified as a single family, Tinamidae, within their own order, the Tinamiformes. They are distantly related to the ratites (order Struthioniformes), that includes the rheas, emus, and kiwis.

- Great tinamou, Tinamus major (near-threatened)
- Little tinamou, Crypturellus soui
- Thicket tinamou, Crypturellus cinnamomeus
- Slaty-breasted tinamou, Crypturellus boucardi

== Ducks, geese, and waterfowl ==
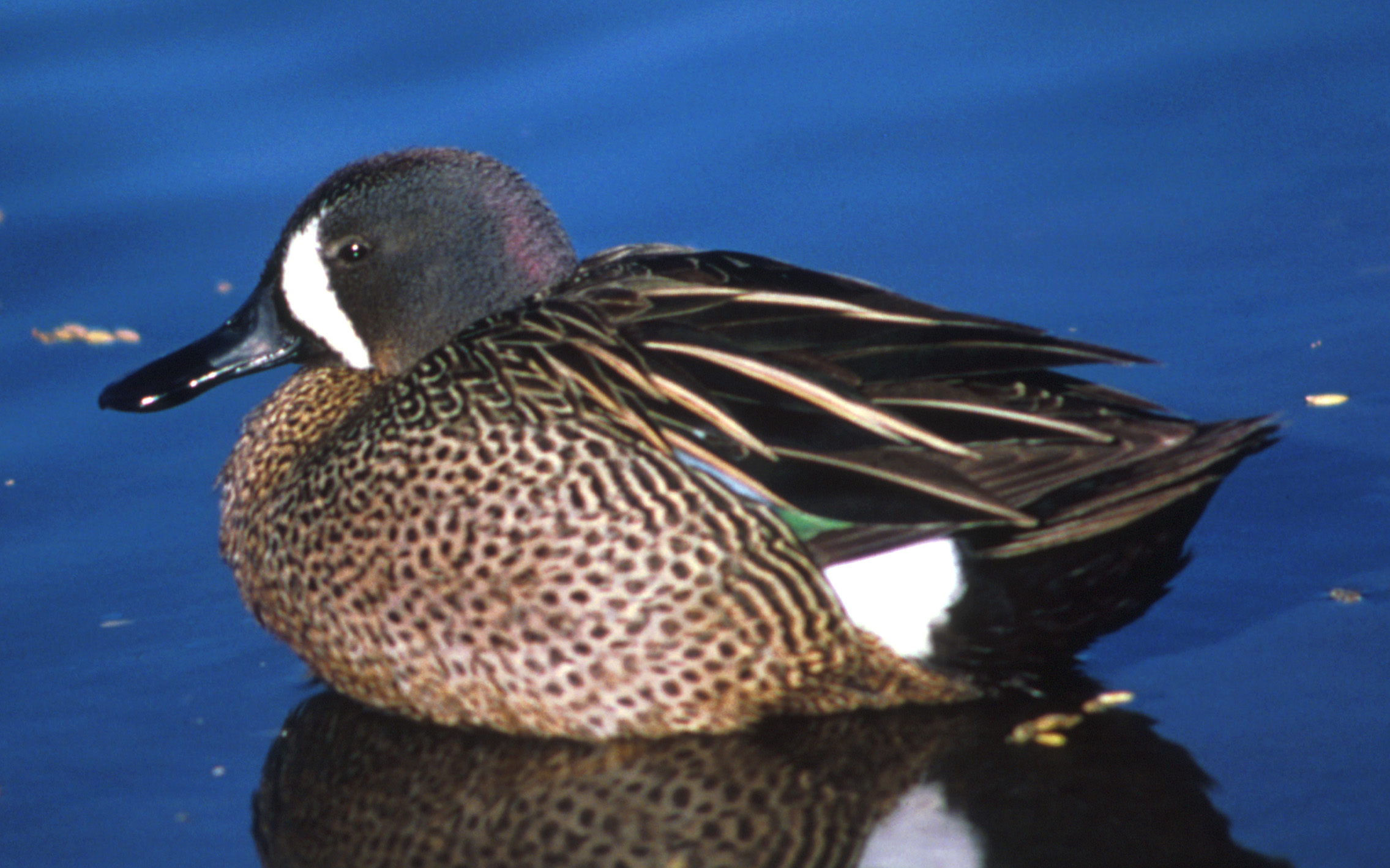
Blue-winged teal

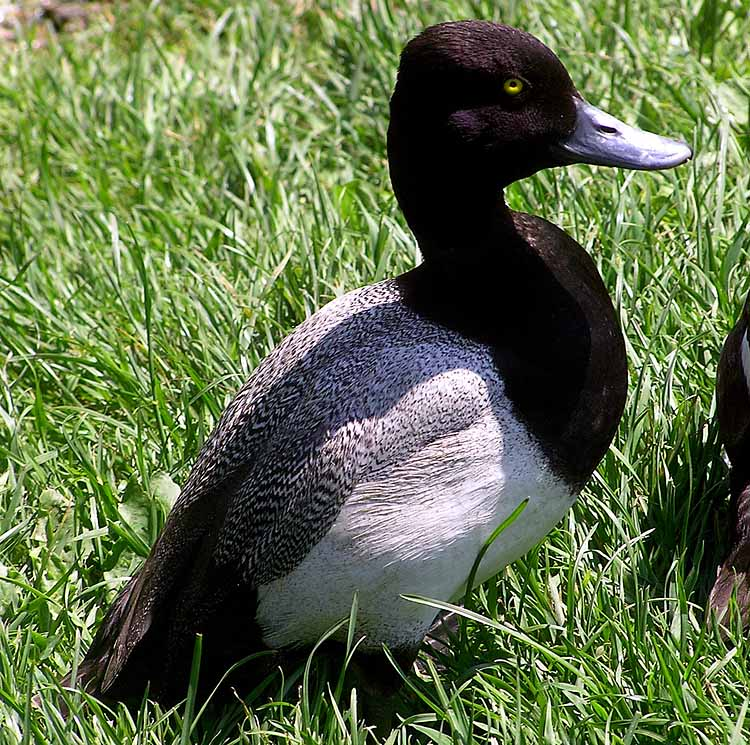
Lesser scaup

Order: Anseriformes Family: Anatidae

Anatidae includes the ducks and most duck-like waterfowl, such as geese and swans. These birds are adapted to an aquatic existence with webbed feet, flattened bills, and feathers that are excellent at shedding water due to an oily coating.

- Black-bellied whistling-duck, Dendrocygna autumnalis
- Fulvous whistling-duck, Dendrocygna bicolor
- Muscovy duck, Cairina moschata
- Blue-winged teal, Spatula discors
- Cinnamon teal, Spatula cyanoptera
- Northern shoveler, Spatula clypeata
- American wigeon, Mareca americana
- Mallard, Anas platyrhynchos (A)
- Northern pintail, Anas acuta
- Green-winged teal, Anas crecca
- Canvasback, Aythya valisineria (A)
- Redhead, Aythya americana (A)
- Ring-necked duck, Aythya collaris
- Greater scaup, Aythya marila (A)
- Lesser scaup, Aythya affinis
- Red-breasted merganser, Mergus serrator (A)
- Masked duck, Nomonyx dominicus
- Ruddy duck, Oxyura jamaicensis (A)

== Guans, chachalacas, and curassows ==
Order: Galliformes Family: Cracidae

The Cracidae are large birds, similar in general appearance to turkeys. The guans and curassows live in trees, but the smaller chachalacas are found in more open scrubby habitats. They are generally dull-plumaged, but the curassows and some guans have colorful facial ornaments.

- Plain chachalaca, Ortalis vetula
- Gray-headed chachalaca, Ortalis cinereiceps
- White-bellied chachalaca, Ortalis leucogastra
- Crested guan, Penelope purpurascens
- Highland guan, Penelopina nigra (vulnerable)
- Great curassow, Crax rubra (vulnerable)

== New World quail ==
Order: Galliformes Family: Odontophoridae

The New World quails are small, plump terrestrial birds only distantly related to the quails of the Old World, but named for their similar appearance and habits.

- Tawny-faced quail, Rhynchortyx cinctus
- Buffy-crowned wood-partridge, Dendrortyx leucophrys
- Black-throated bobwhite, Colinus nigrogularis
- Crested bobwhite, Colinus cristatus
- Ocellated quail, Cyrtonyx ocellatus (A) (vulnerable)
- Black-eared wood-quail, Odontophorus melanotis
- Spotted wood-quail, Odontophorus guttatus

== Grebes ==
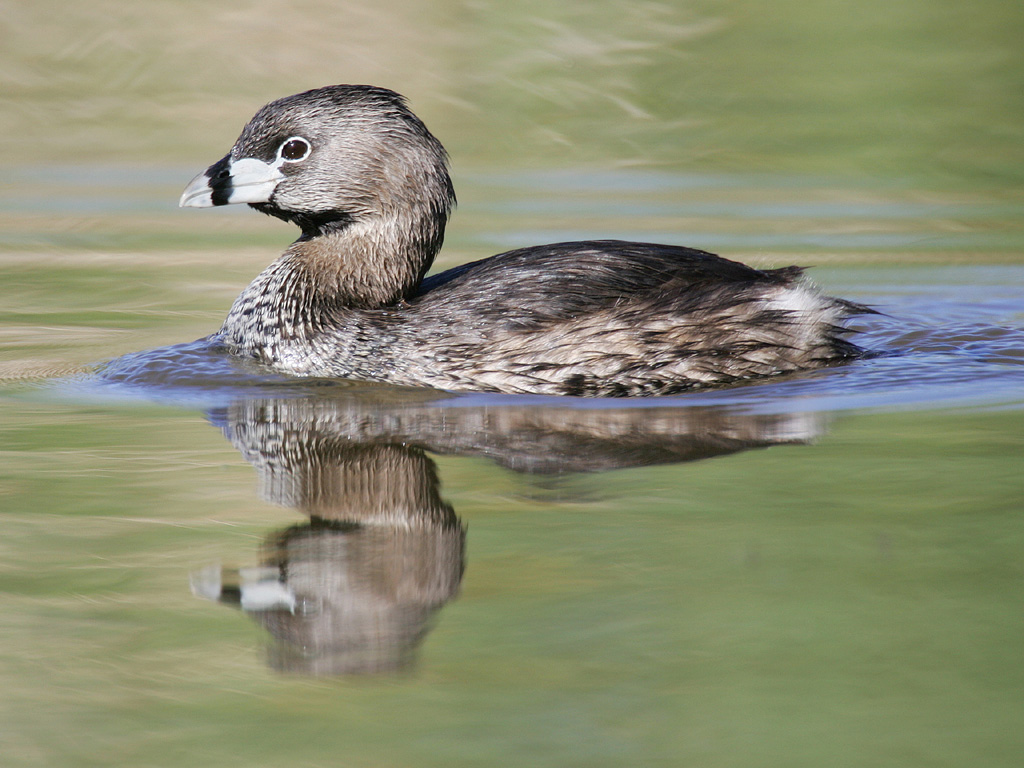
Pied-billed grebe

Order: Podicipediformes Family: Podicipedidae

Grebes are small to medium-large freshwater diving birds. They have lobed toes and are excellent swimmers and divers. However, they have their feet placed far back on the body, making them quite ungainly on land.

- Least grebe, Tachybaptus dominicus
- Pied-billed grebe, Podilymbus podiceps
- Eared grebe, Podiceps nigricollis (A)

== Pigeons and doves ==
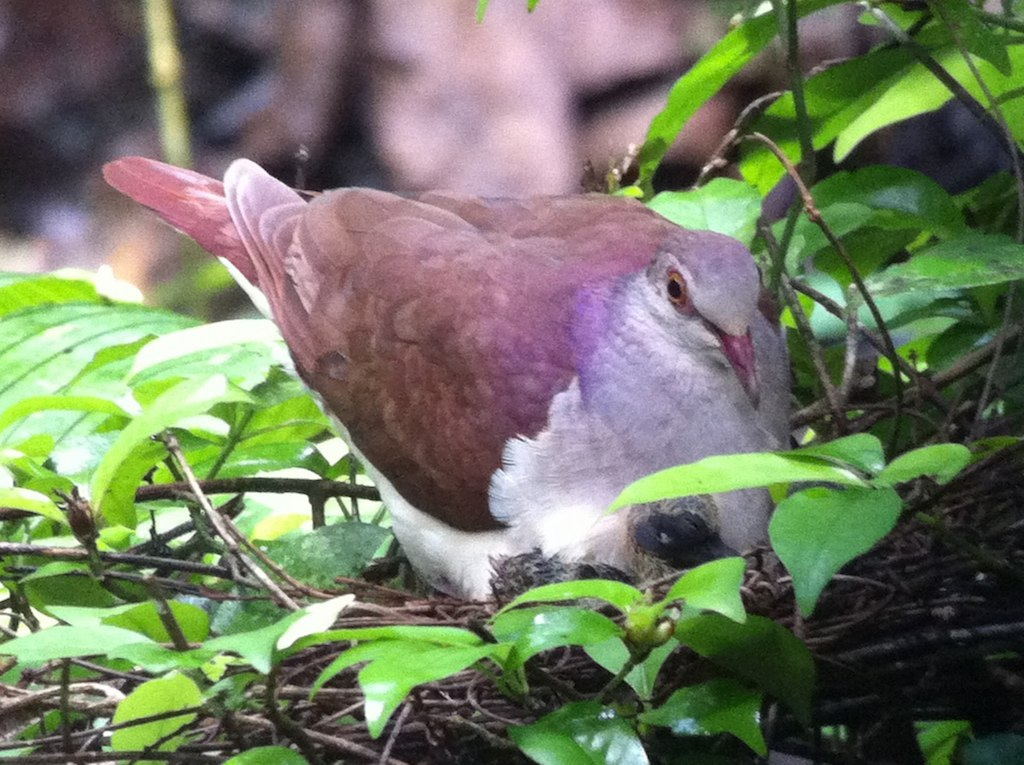
Violaceous quail-dove

Order: Columbiformes Family: Columbidae

Pigeons and doves are stout-bodied birds with short necks and short slender bills with a fleshy cere.

- Rock pigeon, Columba livia (I)
- Pale-vented pigeon, Patagioenas cayennensis
- Scaled pigeon, Patagioenas speciosa
- White-crowned pigeon, Patagioenas leucocephala (near-threatened)
- Red-billed pigeon, Patagioenas flavirostris
- Band-tailed pigeon, Patagioenas fasciata
- Short-billed pigeon, Patagioenas nigrirostris
- Eurasian collared-dove, Streptopelia decaocto (I)
- Inca dove, Columbina inca
- Common ground dove, Columbina passerina
- Plain-breasted ground dove, Columbina minuta
- Ruddy ground dove, Columbina talpacoti
- Blue ground dove, Claravis pretiosa
- Maroon-chested ground dove, Paraclaravis mondetoura (A)
- Ruddy quail-dove, Geotrygon montana
- Violaceous quail-dove, Geotrygon violacea
- Olive-backed quail-dove, Leptotrygon veraguensis (A)
- White-tipped dove, Leptotila verreauxi
- Gray-chested dove, Leptotila cassinii
- Gray-headed dove, Leptotila plumbeiceps
- White-faced quail-dove, Zentrygon albifacies
- White-winged dove, Zenaida asiatica
- Mourning dove, Zenaida macroura

== Cuckoos ==
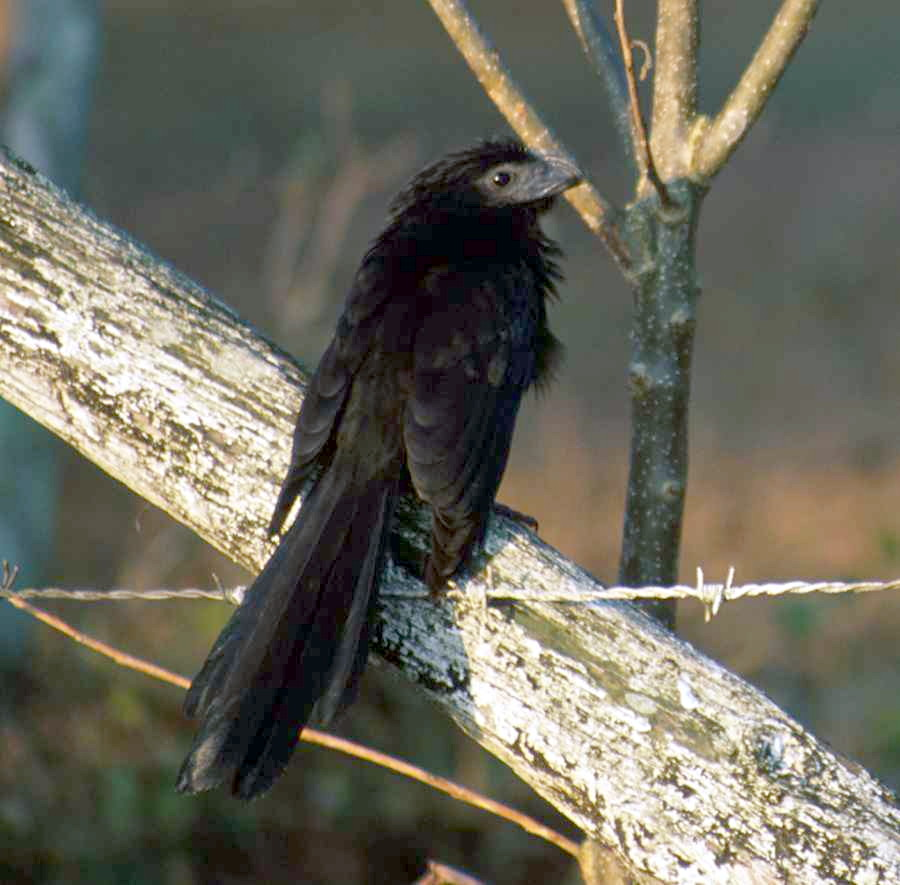
Groove-billed ani

Order: Cuculiformes Family: Cuculidae

The family Cuculidae includes cuckoos, roadrunners, and anis. These birds are of variable size with slender bodies, long tails, and strong legs.

- Smooth-billed ani, Crotophaga ani
- Groove-billed ani, Crotophaga sulcirostris
- Striped cuckoo, Tapera naevia
- Pheasant cuckoo, Dromococcyx phasianellus
- Lesser ground-cuckoo, Morococcyx erythropygus
- Lesser roadrunner, Geococcyx velox
- Rufous-vented ground-cuckoo, Neomorphus geoffroyi (A)
- Squirrel cuckoo, Piaya cayana
- Dark-billed cuckoo, Coccyzus melacoryphus (A)
- Yellow-billed cuckoo, Coccyzus americanus
- Mangrove cuckoo, Coccyzus minor
- Black-billed cuckoo, Coccyzus erythropthalmus

== Nightjars and allies ==
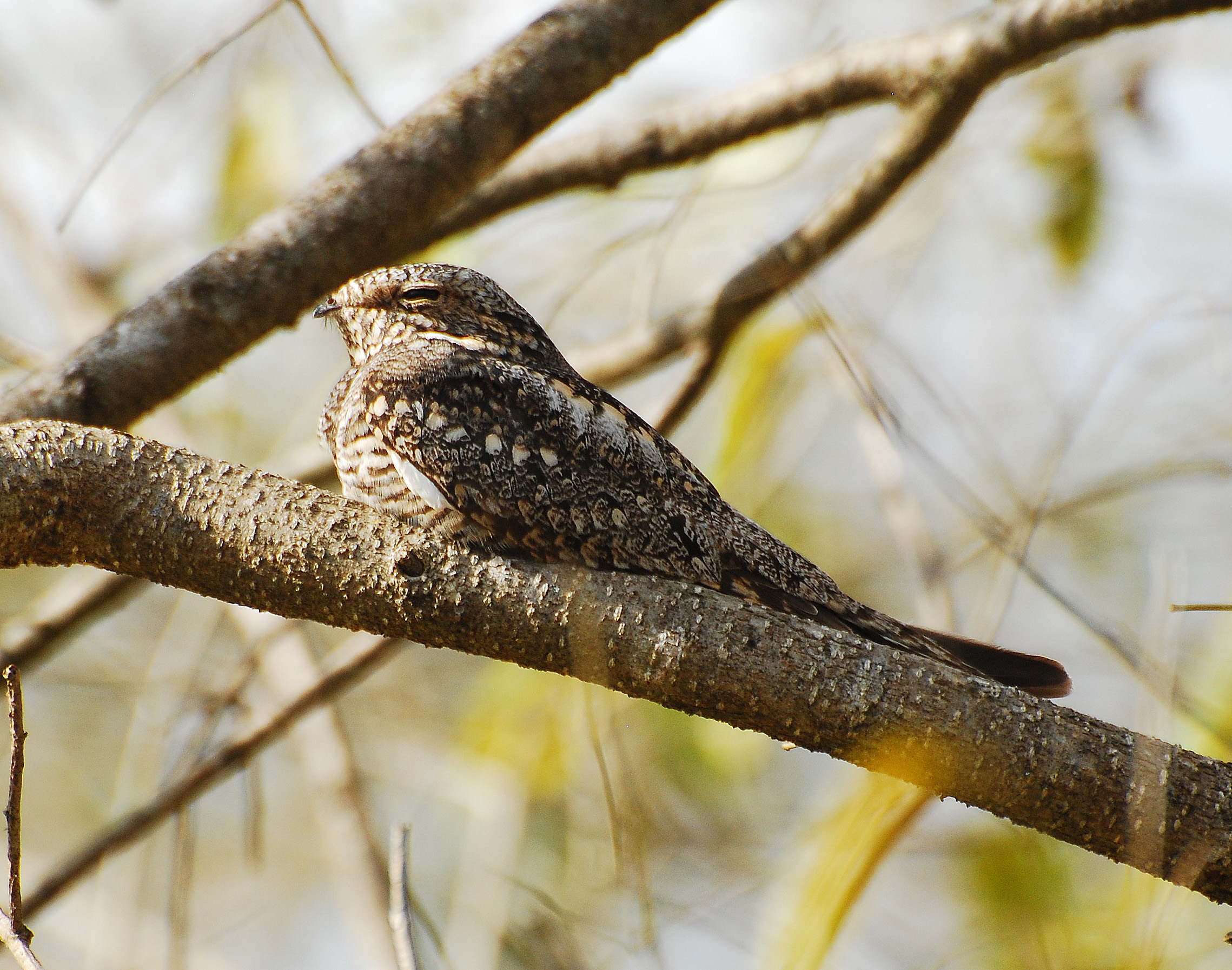
Lesser nighthawk

Order: Caprimulgiformes Family: Caprimulgidae

Nightjars are medium-sized nocturnal birds that usually nest on the ground. They have long wings, short legs, and very short bills. Most have small feet, of little use for walking, and long pointed wings. Their soft plumage is camouflaged to resemble bark or leaves.

- Short-tailed nighthawk, Lurocalis semitorquatus
- Lesser nighthawk, Chordeiles acutipennis
- Common nighthawk, Chordeiles minor
- Common pauraque, Nyctidromus albicollis
- Ocellated poorwill, Nyctiphrynus ocellatus (A)
- Chuck-will's-widow, Antrostomus carolinensis (near-threatened)
- Rufous nightjar, Antrostomus rufus (A)
- Buff-collared nightjar, Antrostomus ridgwayi (A)
- Eastern whip-poor-will, Antrostomus vociferus (near-threatened)
- Mexican whip-poor-will, Antrostomus arizonae (A)
- Spot-tailed nightjar, Hydropsalis maculicaudus (A)

== Potoos ==
Order: Nyctibiiformes Family: Nyctibiidae

The potoos (sometimes called poor-me-ones) are large near passerine birds related to the nightjars and frogmouths. They are nocturnal insectivores which lack the bristles around the mouth found in the true nightjars.

- Great potoo, Nyctibius grandis
- Common potoo, Nyctibius griseus
- Northern potoo, Nyctibius jamaicensis

== Swifts ==
Order: Apodiformes Family: Apodidae

Swifts are small birds which spend the majority of their lives flying. These birds have very short legs and never settle voluntarily on the ground, perching instead only on vertical surfaces. Many swifts have long swept-back wings which resemble a crescent or boomerang.

- Black swift, Cypseloides niger (vulnerable)
- White-chinned swift, Cypseloides cryptus (A)
- Chestnut-collared swift, Streptoprocne rutila
- White-collared swift, Streptoprocne zonaris
- Gray-rumped swift, Chaetura cinereiventris
- Chimney swift, Chaetura pelagica (vulnerable)
- Vaux's swift, Chaetura vauxi
- Lesser swallow-tailed swift, Panyptila cayennensis
- Great swallow-tailed swift, Panyptila sanctihieronymi (A)

== Hummingbirds ==
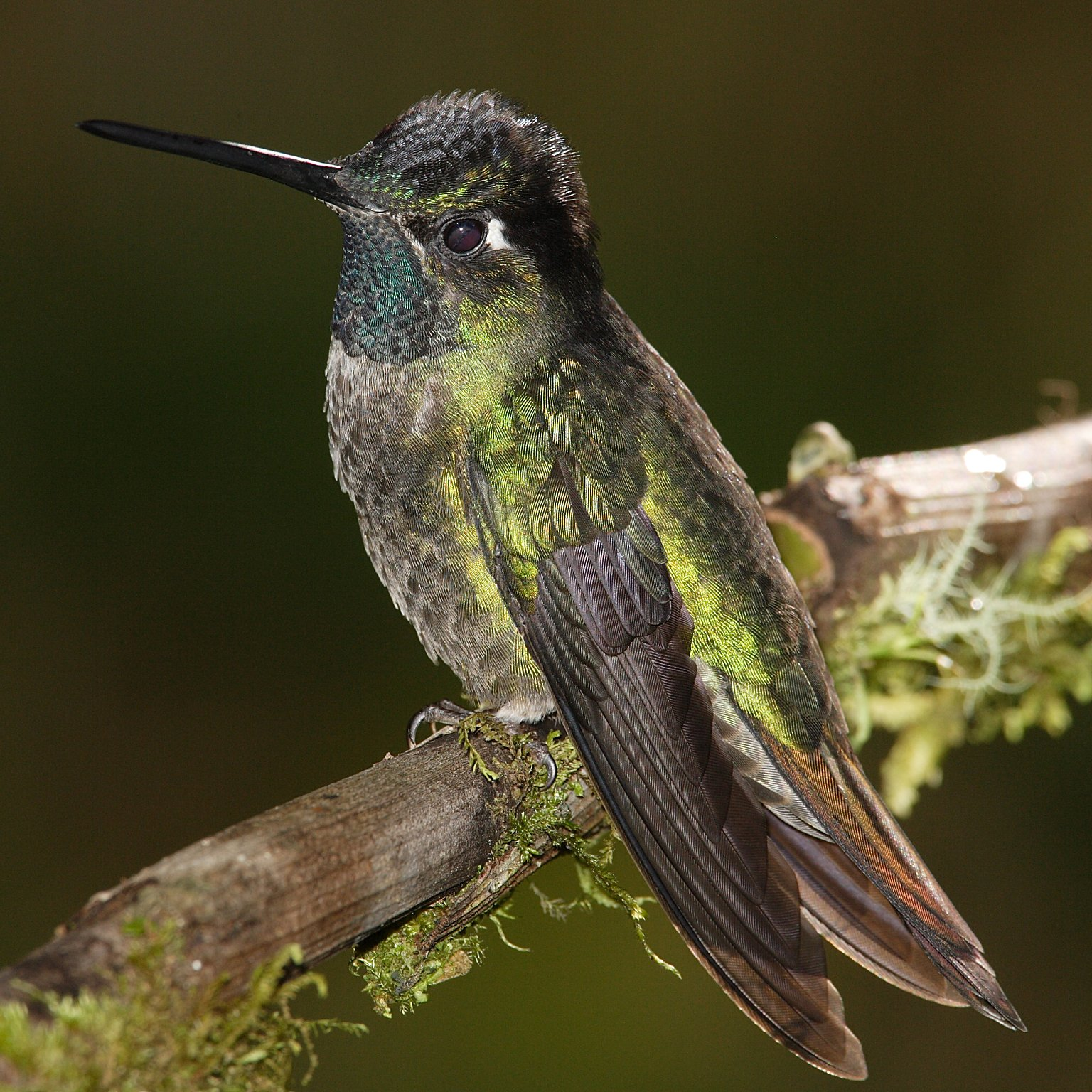
Rivoli's hummingbird

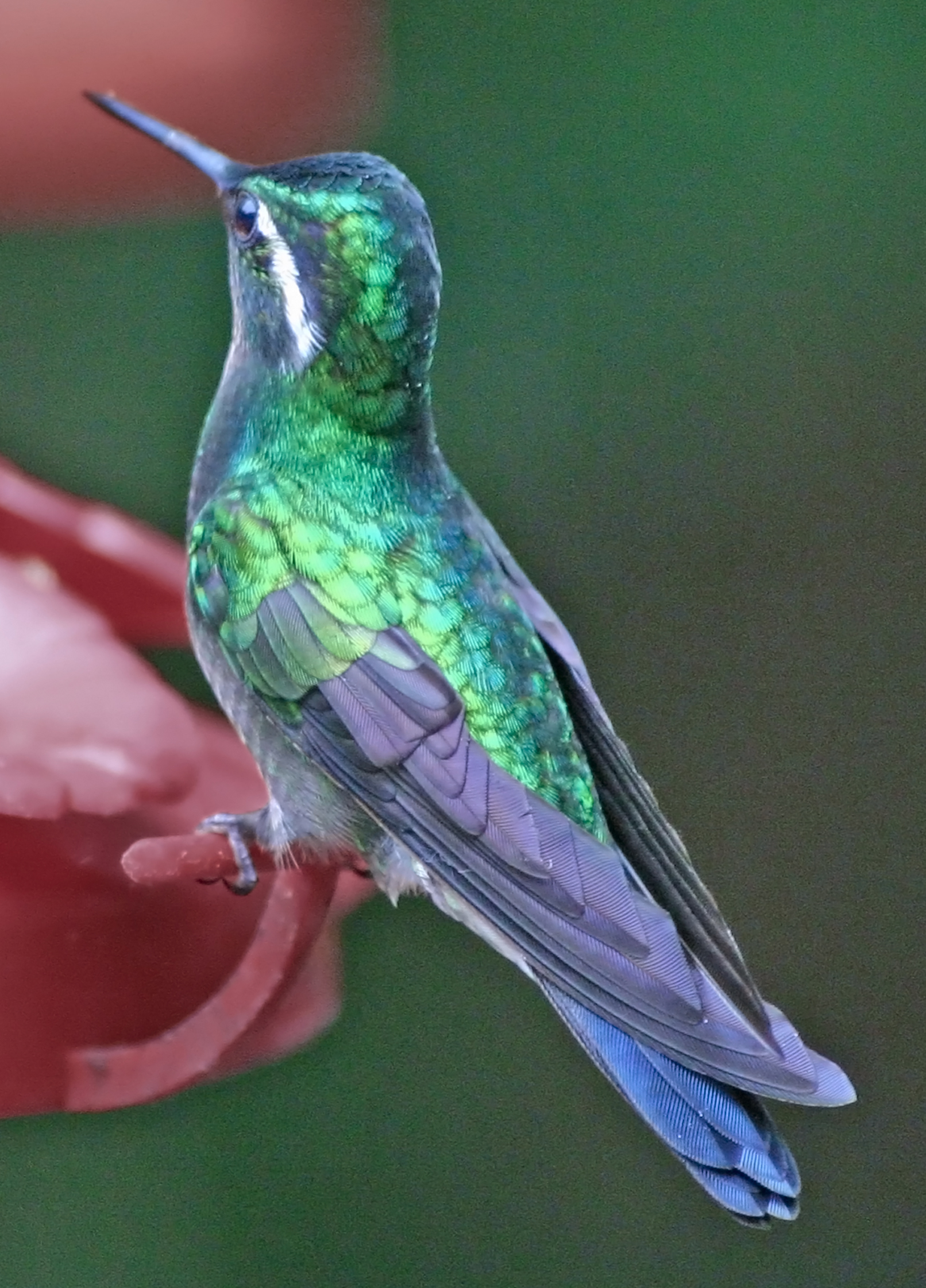
Purple-throated mountain-gem

Order: Apodiformes Family: Trochilidae

Hummingbirds are small birds capable of hovering in mid-air due to the rapid flapping of their wings. They are the only birds that can fly backwards.

- White-necked jacobin, Florisuga mellivora
- Bronzy hermit, Glaucis aeneus
- Band-tailed barbthroat, Threnetes ruckeri
- Long-billed hermit, Phaethornis longirostris
- Stripe-throated hermit, Phaethornis striigularis
- Brown violetear, Colibri delphinae
- Mexican violetear, Colibri thalassinus
- Purple-crowned fairy, Heliothryx barroti
- Green-breasted mango, Anthracothorax prevostii
- Black-throated mango, Anthracothorax nigricollis (A)
- Black-crested coquette, Lophornis helenae
- Rivoli's hummingbird, Eugenes fulgens
- Long-billed starthroat, Heliomaster longirostris
- Plain-capped starthroat, Heliomaster constantii
- Green-breasted mountain-gem, Lampornis sybillae
- Purple-throated mountain-gem, Lampornis calolaemus
- Sparkling-tailed hummingbird, Tilmatura dupontii
- Ruby-throated hummingbird, Archilochus colubris
- Canivet's emerald, Cynanthus canivetii
- White-eared hummingbird, Basilinna leucotis
- Emerald-chinned hummingbird, Abeillia abeillei
- Violet-headed hummingbird, Klais guimeti
- Violet sabrewing, Campylopterus hemileucurus
- Bronze-tailed plumeleteer, Chalybura urochrysia
- Crowned woodnymph, Thalurania colombica
- Snowcap, Microchera albocoronata
- Coppery-headed emerald, Microchera cupreiceps (A)
- Stripe-tailed hummingbird, Eupherusa eximia
- Scaly-breasted hummingbird, Phaeochroa cuvierii
- Azure-crowned hummingbird, Saucerottia cyanocephala
- Blue-vented hummingbird, Saucerottia hoffmanni
- Blue-tailed hummingbird, Saucerottia cyanura
- Cinnamon hummingbird, Amazilia rutila
- Rufous-tailed hummingbird, Amazilia tzacatl
- Blue-chested hummingbird, Polyerata amabilis
- White-bellied emerald, Chlorestes candida
- Blue-throated goldentail, Chlorestes eliciae

== Rails, gallinules, and coots ==
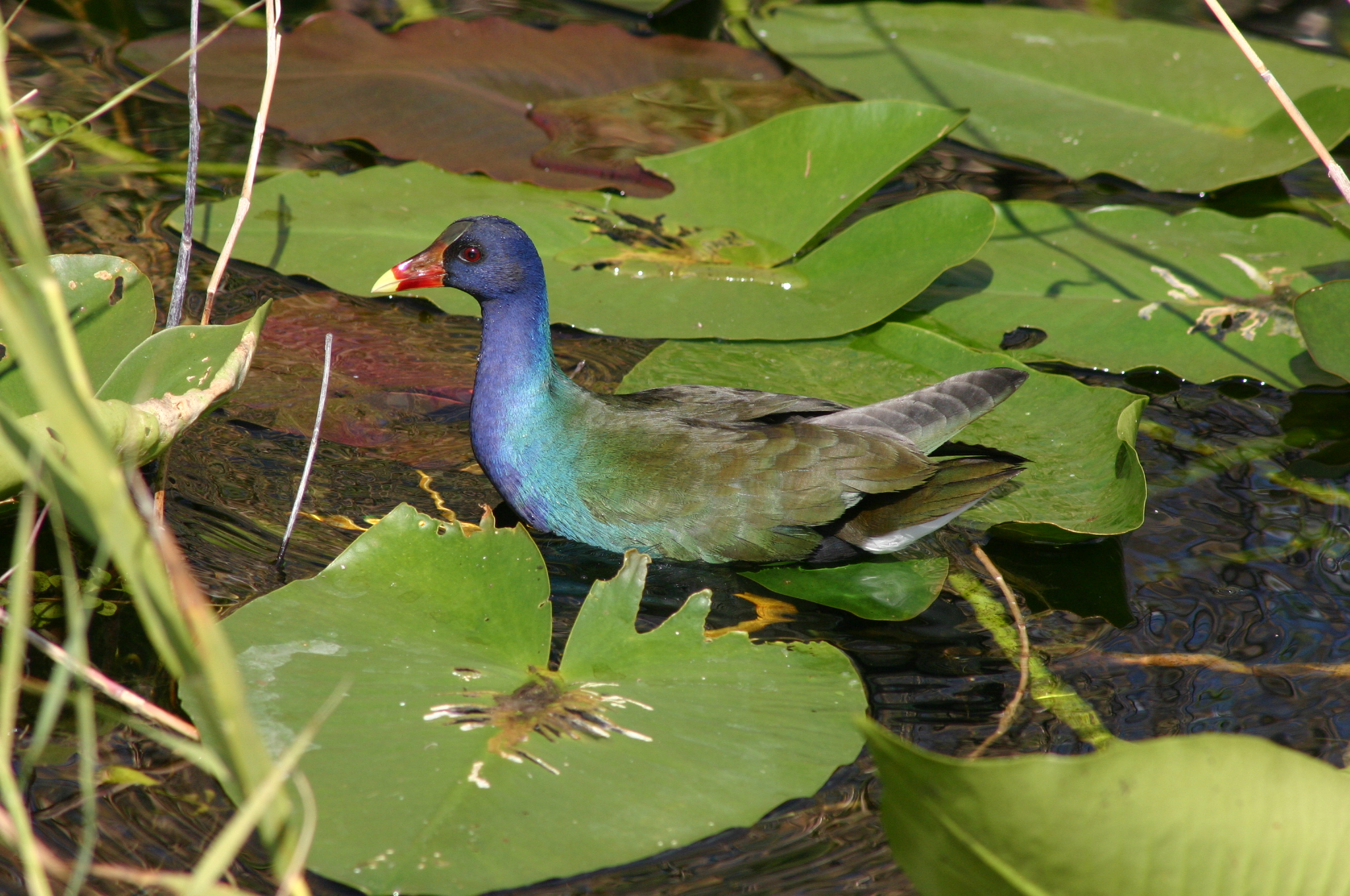
Purple gallinule

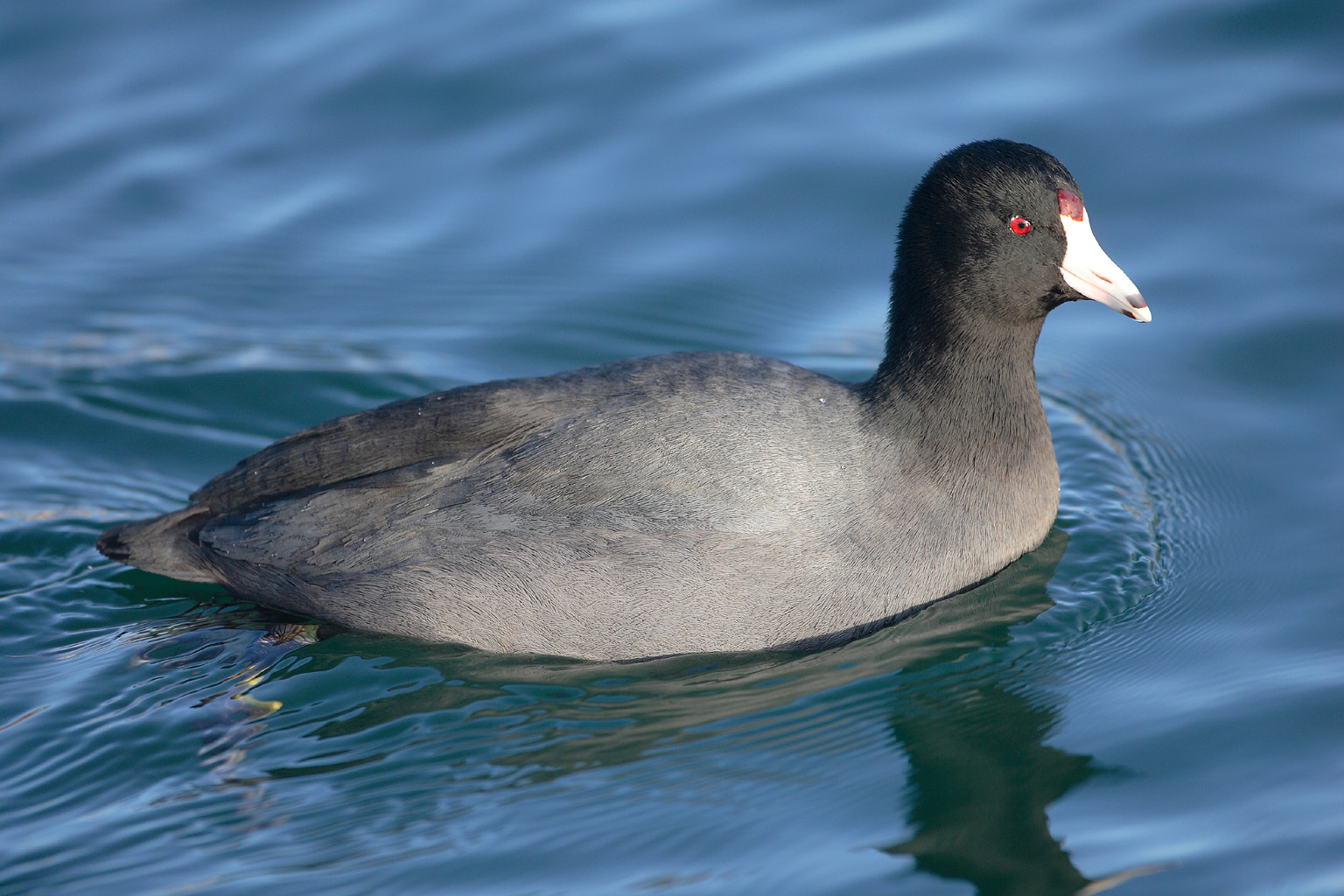
American coot

Order: Gruiformes Family: Rallidae

Rallidae is a large family of small to medium-sized birds which includes the rails, crakes, coots, and gallinules. Typically they inhabit dense vegetation in damp environments near lakes, swamps, or rivers. In general they are shy and secretive birds, making them difficult to observe. Most species have strong legs and long toes which are well adapted to soft uneven surfaces. They tend to have short, rounded wings and to be weak fliers.

- Spotted rail, Pardirallus maculatus (A)
- Uniform crake, Amaurolimnas concolor (A)
- Rufous-necked wood-rail, Aramides axillaris
- Russet-naped wood-rail, Aramides albiventris
- Mangrove rail, Rallus longirostris
- Sora, Porzana carolina
- Common gallinule, Gallinula galeata
- American coot, Fulica americana
- Purple gallinule, Porphyrio martinicus
- Yellow-breasted crake, Hapalocrex flaviventer (A)
- Ruddy crake, Laterallus ruber
- White-throated crake, Laterallus albigularis
- Gray-breasted crake, Laterallus exilis
- Black rail, Laterallus jamaicensis (A)

== Finfoots ==
Order: Gruiformes Family: Heliornithidae

Heliornithidae is a small family of tropical birds with webbed lobes on their feet similar to those of grebes and coots.

- Sungrebe, Heliornis fulica

== Limpkin ==
Order: Gruiformes Family: Aramidae

The limpkin resembles a large rail. It has drab-brown plumage and a grayer head and neck.

- Limpkin, Aramus guarauna

== Thick-knees ==
Order: Charadriiformes Family: Burhinidae

The thick-knees are a group of largely tropical waders in the family Burhinidae. They are found worldwide within the tropical zone, with some species also breeding in temperate Europe and Australia. They are medium to large waders with strong black or yellow-black bills, large yellow eyes, and cryptic plumage. Despite being classed as waders, most species have a preference for arid or semi-arid habitats.

- Double-striped thick-knee, Burhinus bistriatus

== Stilts and avocets ==
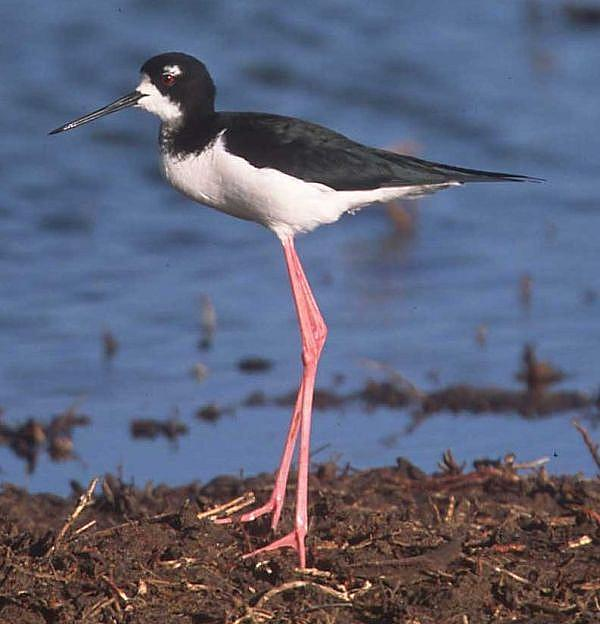
Black-necked stilt

Order: Charadriiformes Family: Recurvirostridae

Recurvirostridae is a family of large wading birds which includes the avocets and stilts. The avocets have long legs and long up-curved bills. The stilts have extremely long legs and long, thin, straight bills.

- Black-necked stilt, Himantopus mexicanus
- American avocet, Recurvirostra americana

== Oystercatchers ==
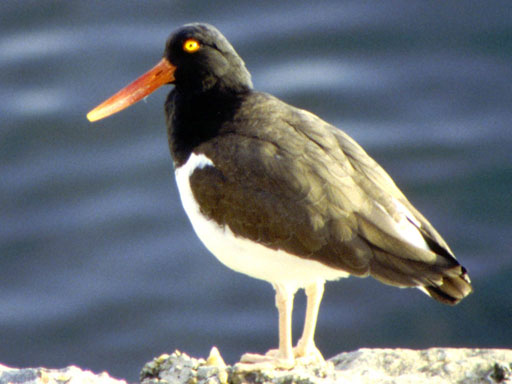
American oystercatcher

Order: Charadriiformes Family: Haematopodidae

The oystercatchers are large and noisy plover-like birds, with strong bills used for smashing or prising open molluscs.

- American oystercatcher, Haematopus palliatus

== Plovers and lapwings ==
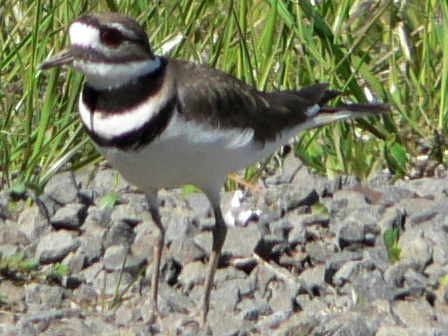
Killdeer

Order: Charadriiformes Family: Charadriidae

The family Charadriidae includes the plovers, dotterels, and lapwings. They are small to medium-sized birds with compact bodies, short thick necks, and long, usually pointed, wings. They are found in open country worldwide, mostly in habitats near water.

- Southern lapwing, Vanellus chilensis (A)
- Black-bellied plover, Pluvialis squatarola
- American golden-plover, Pluvialis dominica
- Pacific golden-plover, Pluvialis fulva (A)
- Killdeer, Charadrius vociferus
- Semipalmated plover, Charadrius semipalmatus
- Piping plover, Charadrius melodus (A) (near-threatened)
- Wilson's plover, Charadrius wilsonia
- Collared plover, Charadrius collaris
- Snowy plover, Charadrius nivosus (near-threatened)

== Jacanas ==
Order: Charadriiformes Family: Jacanidae

The jacanas are a group of tropical waders. They are identifiable by their huge feet and claws which enable them to walk on floating vegetation in the shallow lakes that are their preferred habitat.

- Northern jacana, Jacana spinosa
- Wattled jacana, Jacana jacana (A)

== Sandpipers and allies ==
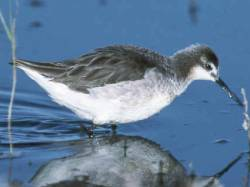
Wilson's phalarope

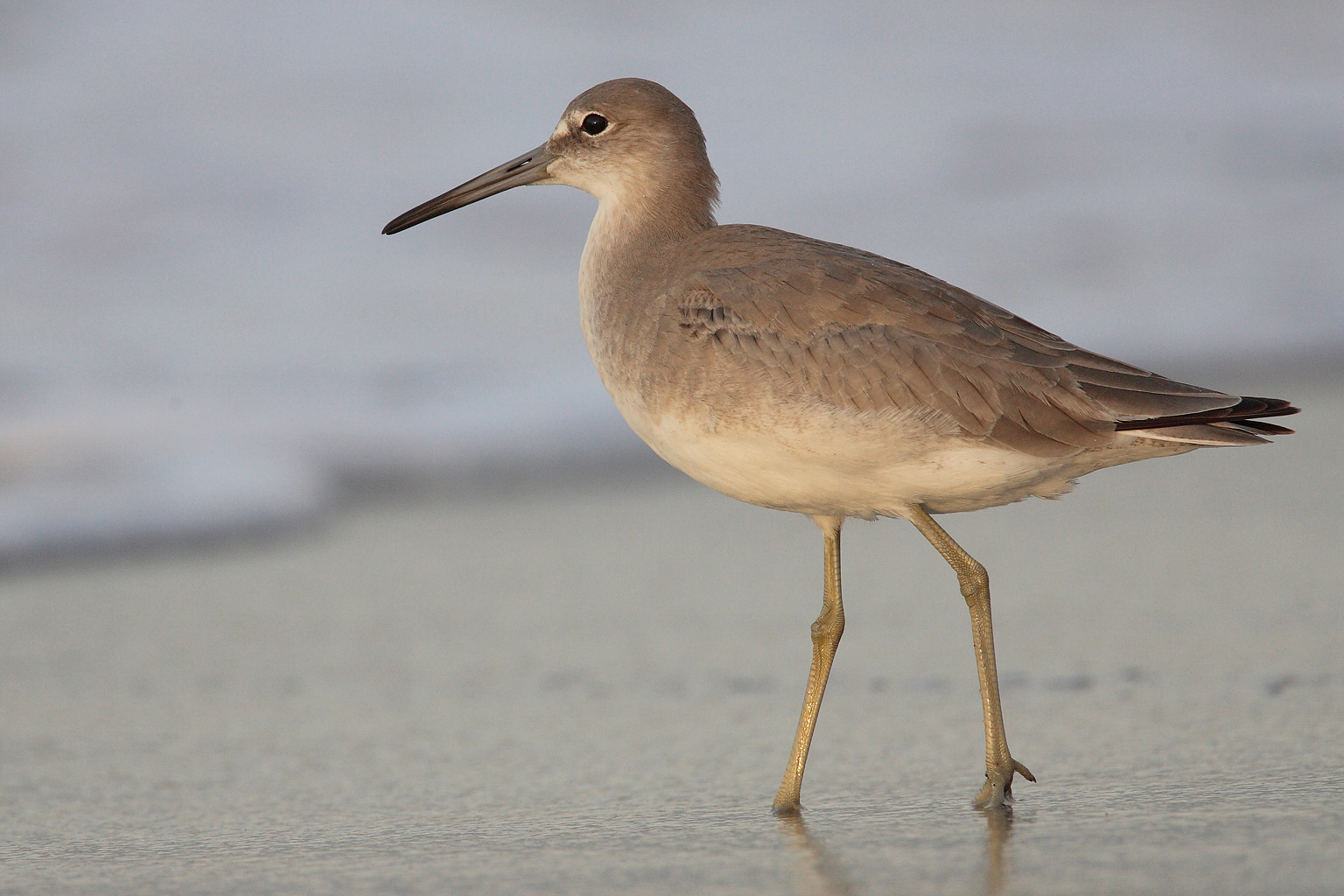
Willet

Order: Charadriiformes Family: Scolopacidae

Scolopacidae is a large diverse family of small to medium-sized shorebirds including the sandpipers, curlews, godwits, shanks, tattlers, woodcocks, snipes, dowitchers, and phalaropes. The majority of these species eat small invertebrates picked out of the mud or soil. Variation in length of legs and bills enables multiple species to feed in the same habitat, particularly on the coast, without direct competition for food.

- Upland sandpiper, Bartramia longicauda (A)
- Whimbrel, Numenius phaeopus
- Long-billed curlew, Numenius americanus
- Hudsonian godwit, Limosa haemastica (A)
- Marbled godwit, Limosa fedoa
- Ruddy turnstone, Arenaria interpres
- Black turnstone, Arenaria melanocephala (A)
- Red knot, Calidris canutus (near-threatened)
- Surfbird, Calidris virgata
- Stilt sandpiper, Calidris himantopus
- Sanderling, Calidris alba
- Dunlin, Calidris alpina
- Baird's sandpiper, Calidris bairdii (A)
- Least sandpiper, Calidris minutilla
- White-rumped sandpiper, Calidris fuscicollis
- Buff-breasted sandpiper, Calidris subruficollis (A) (near-threatened)
- Pectoral sandpiper, Calidris melanotos
- Semipalmated sandpiper, Calidris pusilla (near-threatened)
- Western sandpiper, Calidris mauri
- Short-billed dowitcher, Limnodromus griseus
- Long-billed dowitcher, Limnodromus scolopaceus
- Wilson's snipe, Gallinago delicata
- Spotted sandpiper, Actitis macularius
- Solitary sandpiper, Tringa solitaria
- Wandering tattler, Tringa incana
- Lesser yellowlegs, Tringa flavipes
- Willet, Tringa semipalmata
- Greater yellowlegs, Tringa melanoleuca
- Wilson's phalarope, Phalaropus tricolor
- Red-necked phalarope, Phalaropus lobatus
- Red phalarope, Phalaropus fulicarius (A)

== Skuas and jaegers ==
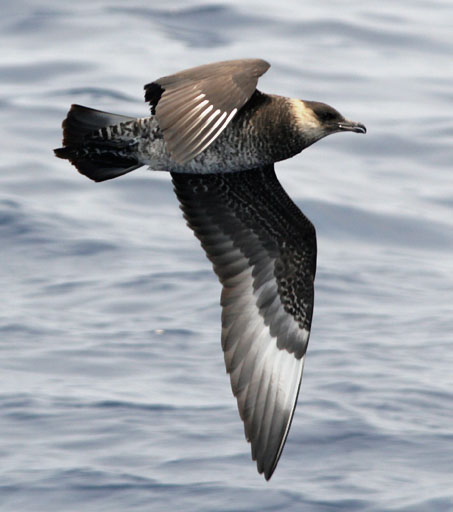
Pomarine jaeger

Order: Charadriiformes Family: Stercorariidae

The family Stercorariidae are, in general, medium to large birds, typically with gray or brown plumage, often with white markings on the wings. They nest on the ground in temperate and arctic regions and are long-distance migrants.

- Pomarine jaeger, Stercorarius pomarinus (A)
- Parasitic jaeger, Stercorarius parasiticus (A)
- Long-tailed jaeger, Stercorarius longicaudus (A)

== Gulls, terns, and skimmers ==
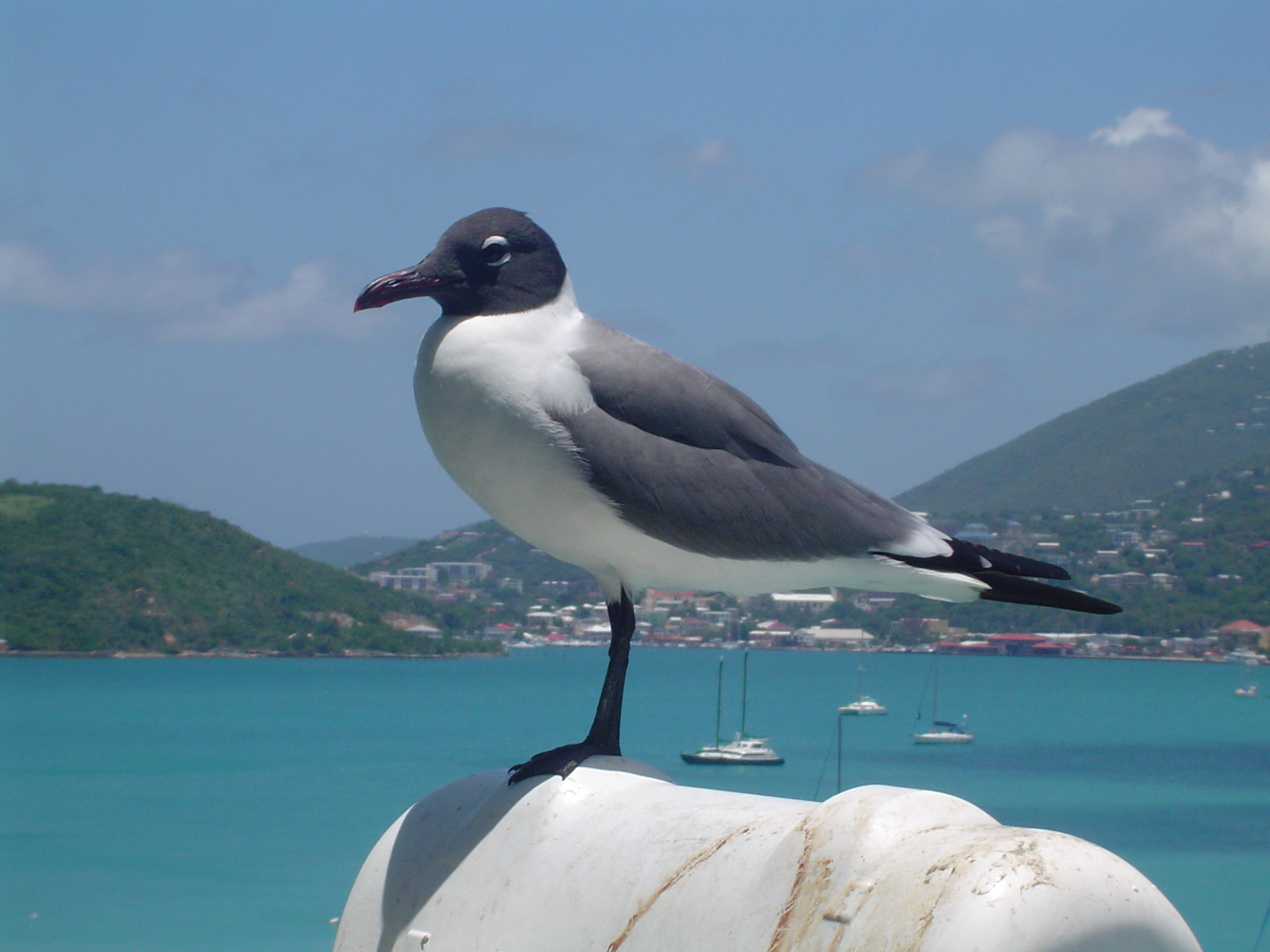
Laughing gull

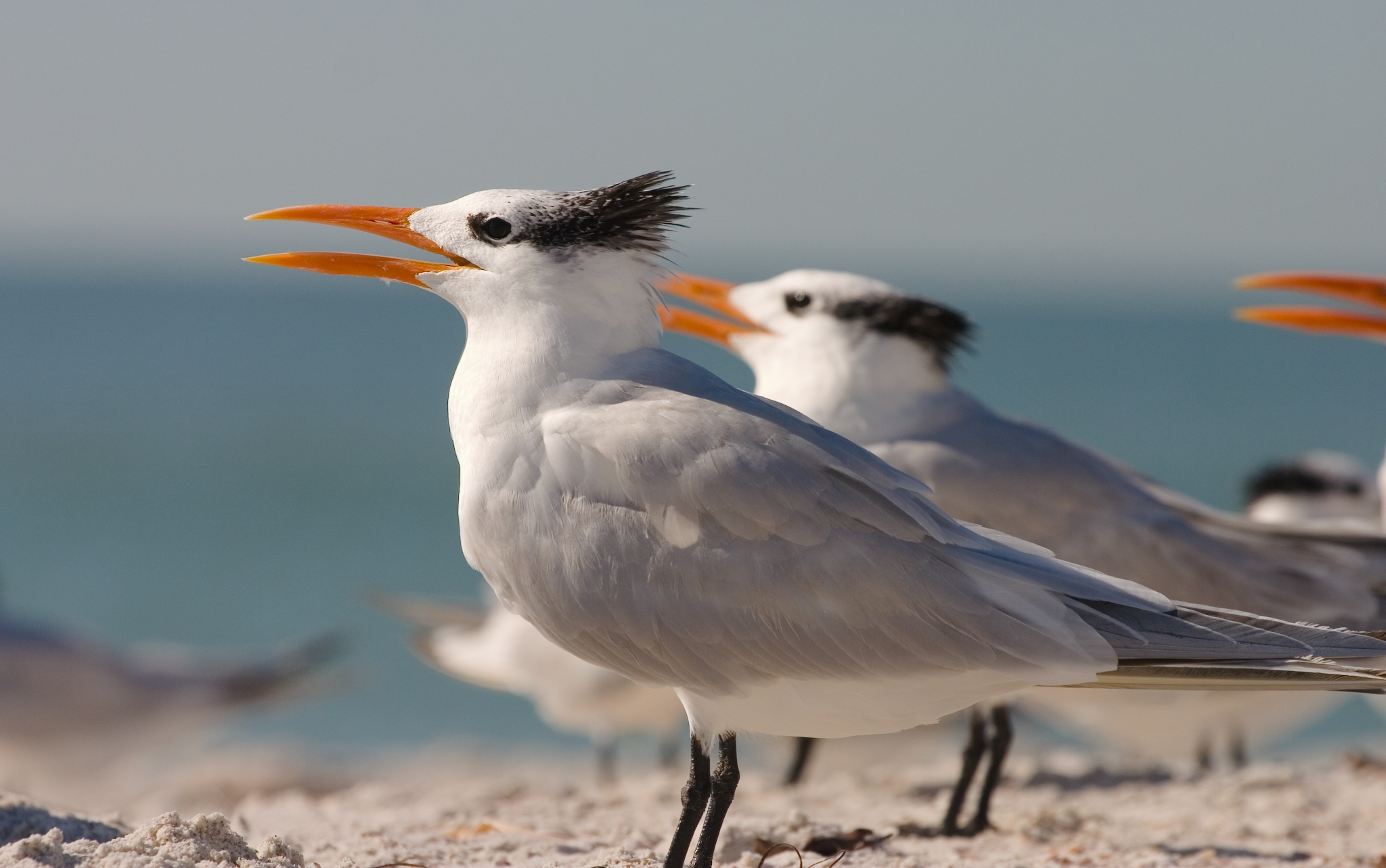
Royal tern

Order: Charadriiformes Family: Laridae

Laridae is a family of medium to large seabirds and includes gulls, kittiwakes, terns, and skimmers. They are typically gray or white, often with black markings on the head or wings. They have longish bills and webbed feet. Terns are a group of generally medium to large seabirds typically with gray or white plumage, often with black markings on the head. Most terns hunt fish by diving but some pick insects off the surface of fresh water. Terns are generally long-lived birds, with several species known to live in excess of 30 years. Skimmers are a small group of tropical tern-like birds. They have an elongated lower mandible which they use to feed by flying low over the water surface and skimming the water for small fish.

- Sabine's gull, Xema sabini
- Bonaparte's gull, Chroicocephalus philadelphia (A)
- Laughing gull, Leucophaeus atricilla
- Franklin's gull, Leucophaeus pipixcan
- Ring-billed gull, Larus delawarensis (A)
- California gull, Larus californicus (A)
- Herring gull, Larus argentatus
- Lesser black-backed gull, Larus fuscus (A)
- Kelp gull, Larus dominicanus (A)
- Brown noddy, Anous stolidus (A)
- Sooty tern, Onychoprion fuscata (A)
- Bridled tern, Onychoprion anaethetus
- Least tern, Sternula antillarum
- Large-billed tern, Phaetusa simplex (A)
- Gull-billed tern, Gelochelidon nilotica
- Caspian tern, Hydroprogne caspia
- Black tern, Chlidonias niger
- Roseate Tern, Sterna dougallii (A)
- Common tern, Sterna hirundo
- Arctic tern, Sterna paradisaea (A)
- Forster's tern, Sterna forsteri
- Royal tern, Thalasseus maxima
- Sandwich tern, Thalasseus sandvicensis
- Elegant tern, Thalasseus elegans (near-threatened)
- Black skimmer, Rynchops niger

== Sunbittern ==
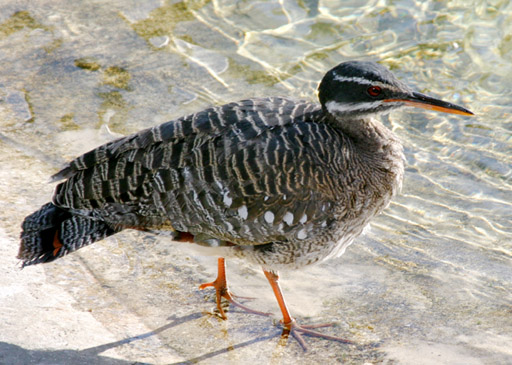
Sunbittern

Order: Eurypygiformes Family: Eurypygidae

The sunbittern is a bittern-like bird of tropical regions of the Americas and the sole member of the family Eurypygidae (sometimes spelled Eurypigidae) and genus Eurypyga.

- Sunbittern, Eurypyga helias

== Tropicbirds ==
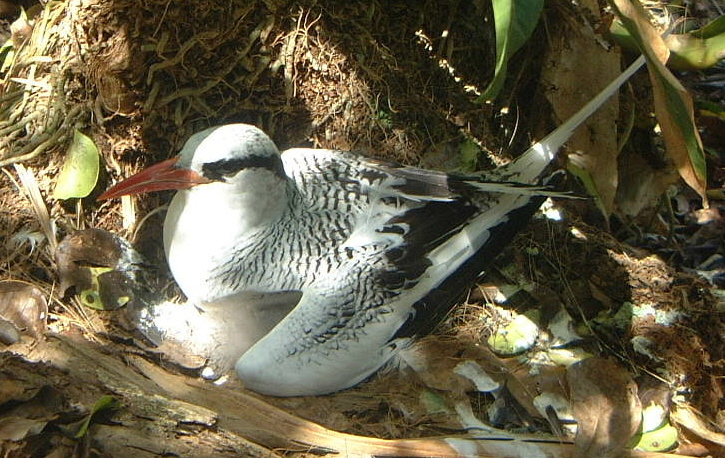
Red-billed tropicbird

Order: Phaethontiformes Family: Phaethontidae

Tropicbirds are slender white birds of tropical oceans with exceptionally long central tail feathers. Their heads and long wings have black markings.

- Red-billed tropicbird, Phaethon aethereus (A)

== Northern storm-petrels ==
Order: Procellariiformes Family: Hydrobatidae

The storm-petrels are relatives of the petrels and are the smallest seabirds. They feed on planktonic crustaceans and small fish picked from the surface, typically while hovering. The flight is fluttering and sometimes bat-like.

- Leach's storm-petrel, Hydrobates leucorhous (A) (vulnerable)
- Wedge-rumped storm-petrel, Hydrobates tethys (A)
- Black storm-petrel, Hydrobates melania
- Markham's storm-petrel, Hydrobates markhami (A) (near-threatened)
- Least storm-petrel, Hydrobates microsoma

== Shearwaters and petrels ==
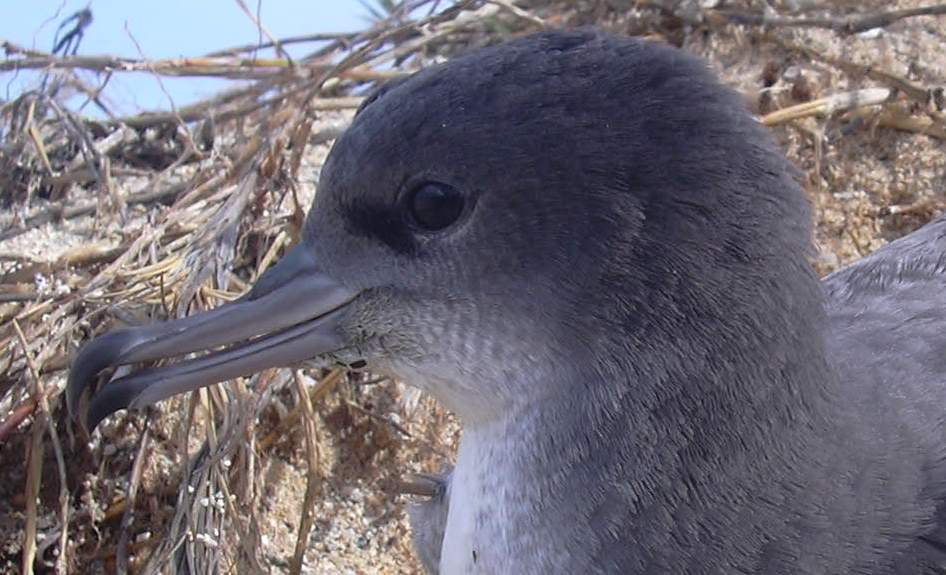
Wedge-tailed shearwater

Order: Procellariiformes Family: Procellariidae

The procellariids are the main group of medium-sized "true petrels", characterized by united nostrils with medium septum and a long outer functional primary.

- Black-capped petrel, Pterodroma hasitata (A)
- Parkinson's petrel, Procellaria parkinsoni (A) (vulnerable)
- Wedge-tailed shearwater, Ardenna pacifica (A)
- Sooty shearwater, Ardenna grisea (A) (near-threatened)
- Pink-footed shearwater, Ardenna creatopus (A) (vulnerable)
- Galapagos shearwater, Puffinus subalaris (A)
- Black-vented shearwater, Puffinus opisthomelas (A)
- Sargasso shearwater, Puffinus lherminieri

== Storks ==
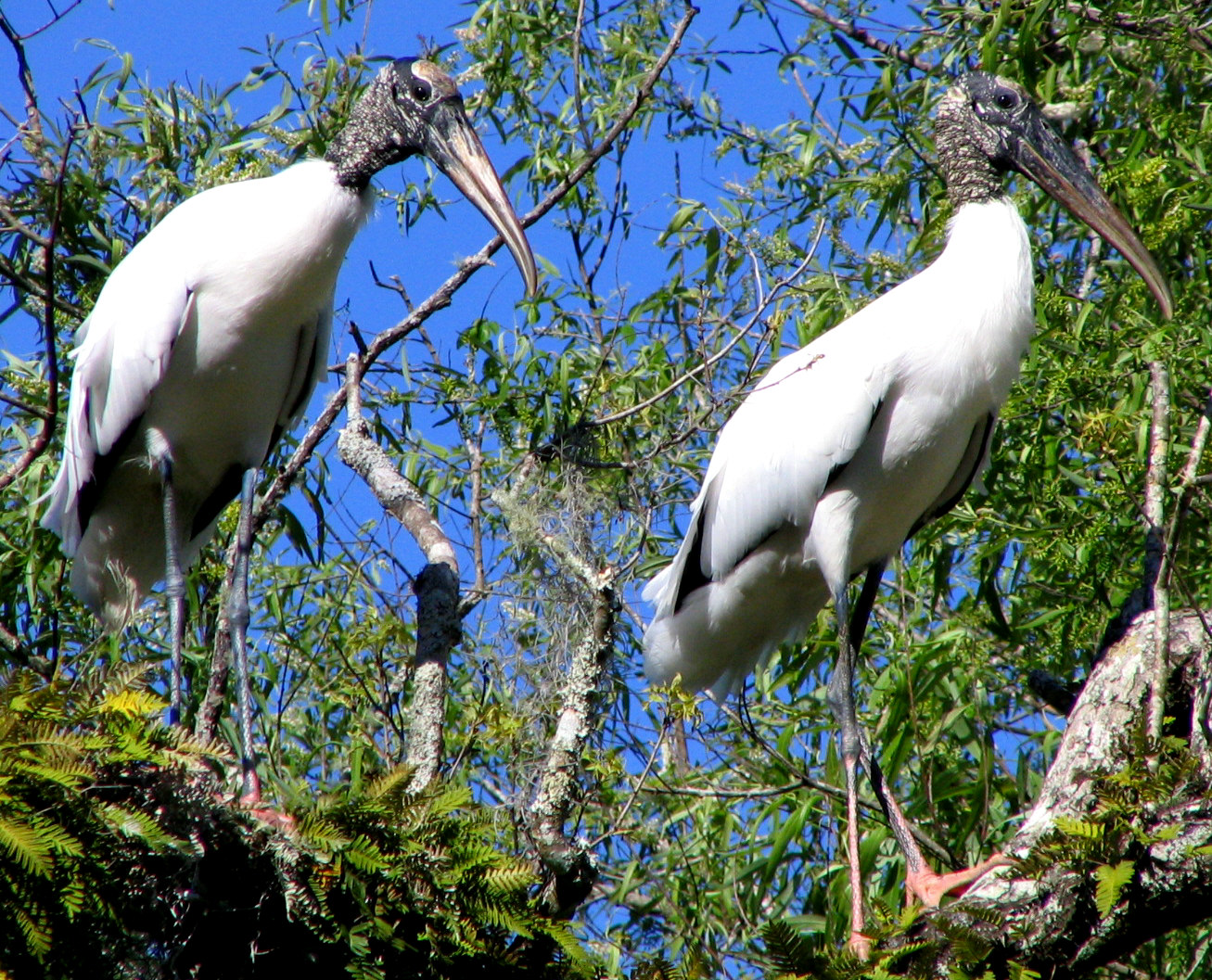
Wood storks

Order: Ciconiiformes Family: Ciconiidae

Storks are large, long-legged, long-necked wading birds with long, stout bills. Storks are mute, but bill-clattering is an important mode of communication at the nest. Their nests can be large and may be reused for many years. Many species are migratory.

- Jabiru, Jabiru mycteria
- Wood stork, Mycteria americana

== Frigatebirds ==
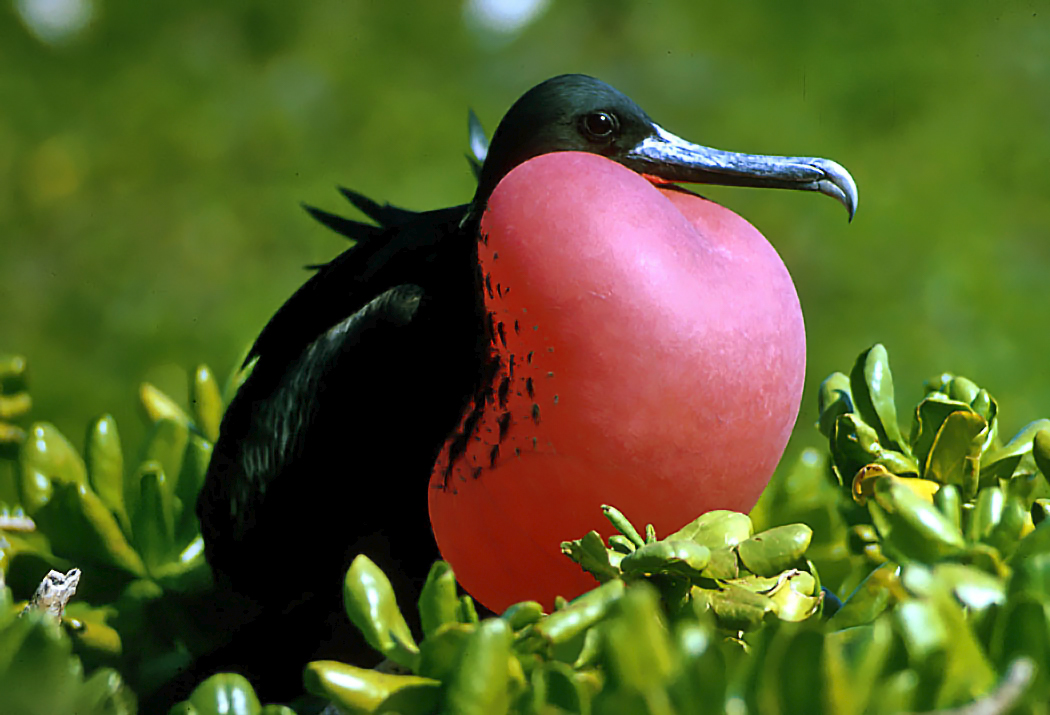
Magnificent frigatebird

Order: Suliformes Family: Fregatidae

Frigatebirds are large seabirds usually found over tropical oceans. They are large, black-and-white, or completely black, with long wings and deeply forked tails. The males have colored inflatable throat pouches. They do not swim or walk and cannot take off from a flat surface. Having the largest wingspan-to-body-weight ratio of any bird, they are essentially aerial, able to stay aloft for more than a week.

- Magnificent frigatebird, Fregata magnificens
- Great frigatebird, Fregata minor(A)

== Boobies and gannets ==
Order: Suliformes Family: Sulidae

The sulids comprise the gannets and boobies. Both groups are medium to large coastal seabirds that plunge-dive for fish.

- Masked booby, Sula dactylatra (A)
- Nazca booby, Sula granti (A)
- Blue-footed booby, Sula nebouxii
- Cocos booby, Sula brewsteri
- Red-footed booby, Sula sula (A)

== Anhingas ==
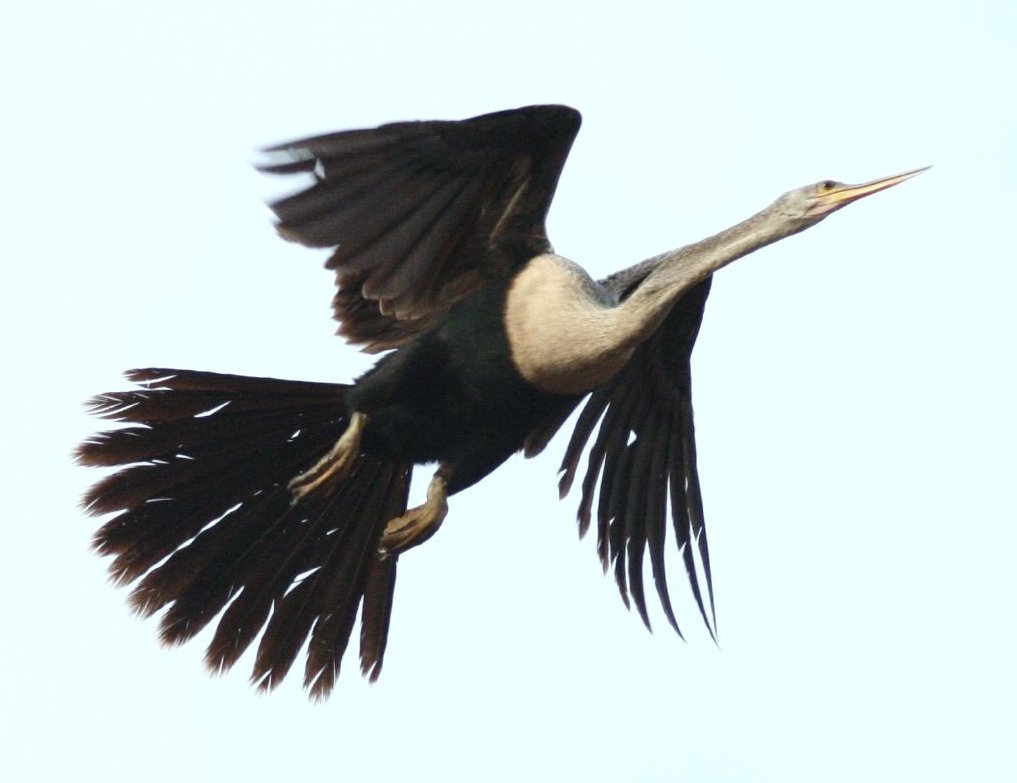
Anhinga

Order: Suliformes Family: Anhingidae

Anhingas are often called "snake-birds" because of their long thin neck, which gives a snake-like appearance when they swim with their bodies submerged. The males have black and dark-brown plumage, an erectile crest on the nape, and a larger bill than the female. The females have much paler plumage especially on the neck and underparts. The anhingas have completely webbed feet and their legs are short and set far back on the body. Their plumage is somewhat permeable, like that of cormorants, and they spread their wings to dry after diving.

- Anhinga, Anhinga anhinga

== Cormorants and shags ==
Order: Suliformes Family: Phalacrocoracidae

Phalacrocoracidae is a family of medium to large coastal, fish-eating seabirds that includes cormorants and shags. Plumage coloration varies, with the majority having mainly dark plumage, some species being black-and-white and a few being colorful.

- Double-crested cormorant, Nannopterum auritum (A)
- Neotropic cormorant, Nannopterum brasilianum

== Pelicans ==
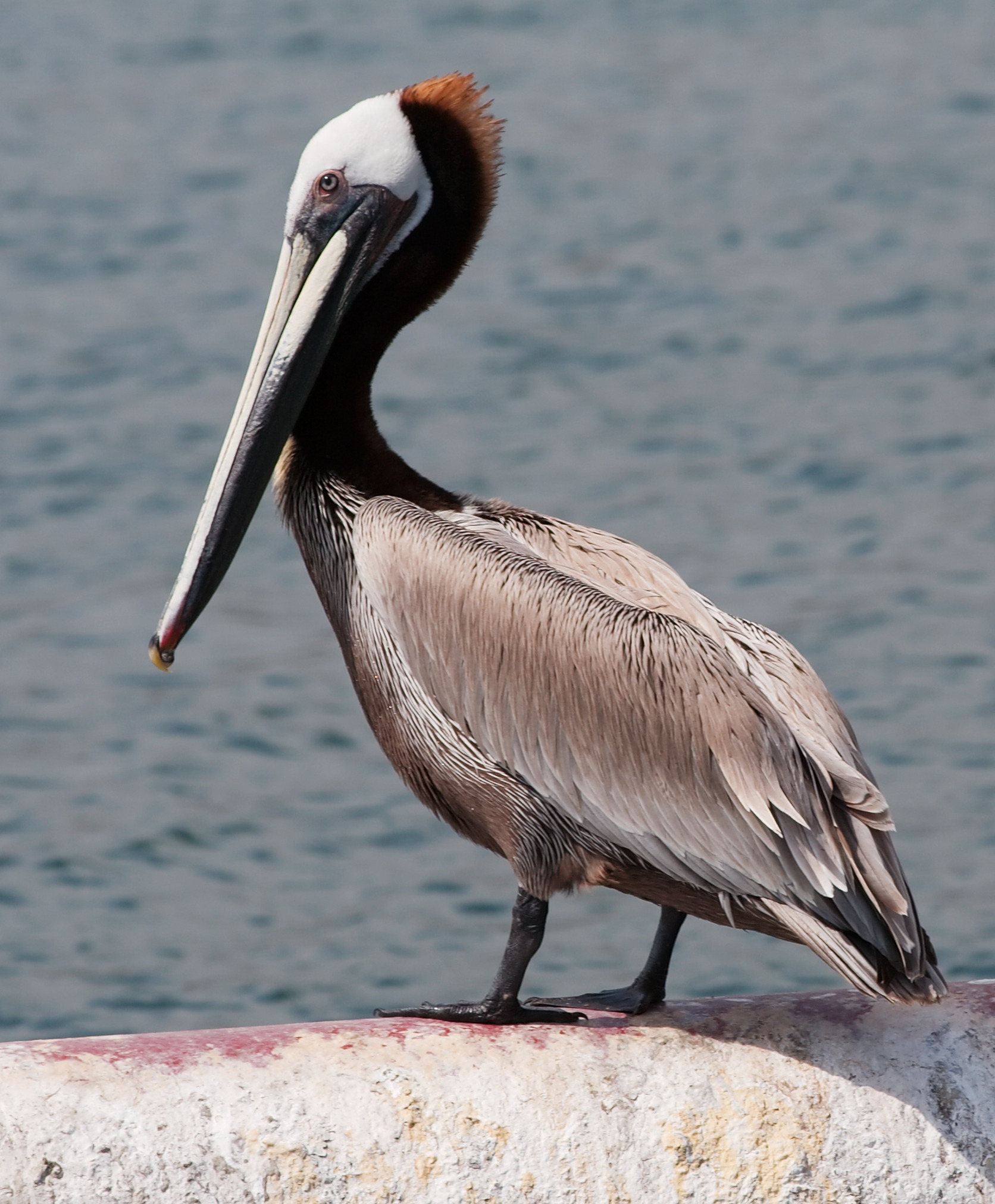
Brown pelican

Order: Pelecaniformes Family: Pelecanidae

Pelicans are large water birds with a distinctive pouch under their beak. As with other members of the order Pelecaniformes, they have webbed feet with four toes.

- American white pelican, Pelecanus erythrorhynchos
- Brown pelican, Pelecanus occidentalis

== Herons, egrets, and bitterns ==
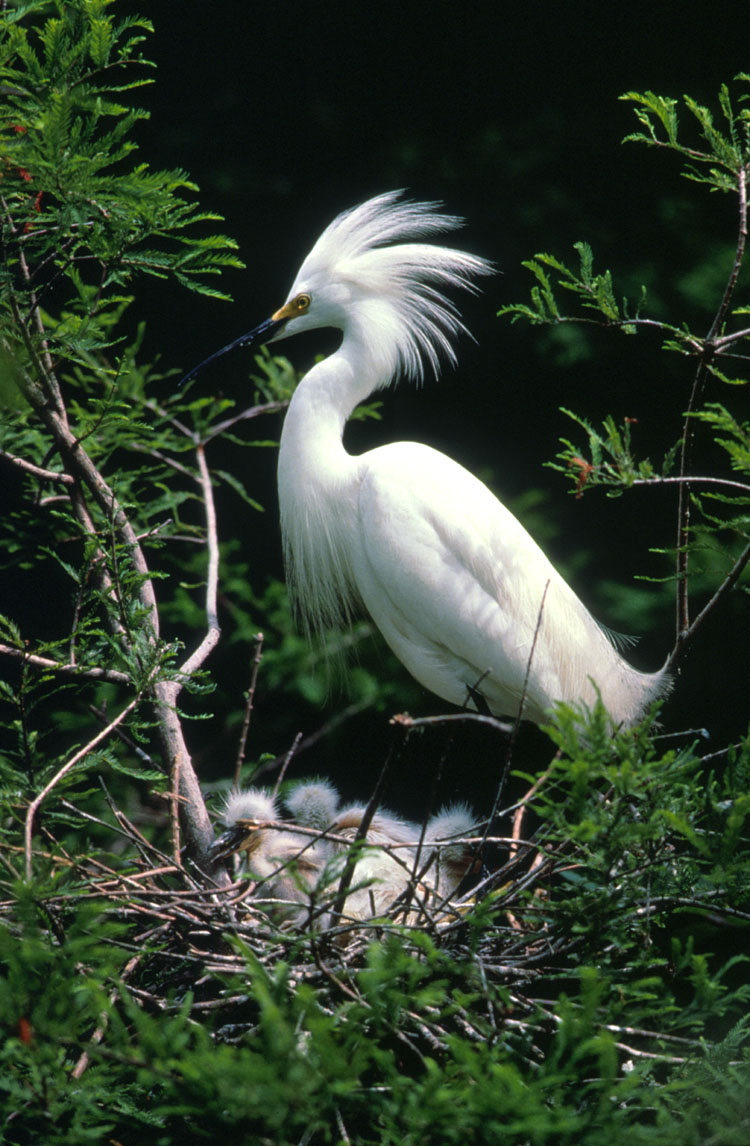
Snowy egret

Order: Pelecaniformes Family: Ardeidae

The family Ardeidae contains the bitterns, herons, and egrets. Herons and egrets are medium to large wading birds with long necks and legs. Bitterns tend to be shorter necked and more wary. Members of Ardeidae fly with their necks retracted, unlike other long-necked birds such as storks, ibises, and spoonbills.

- Pinnated bittern, Botaurus pinnatus
- American bittern, Botaurus lentiginosus (A)
- Least bittern, Ixobrychus exilis
- Rufescent tiger-heron, Tigrisoma lineatum
- Fasciated tiger-heron, Tigrisoma fasciatum (A)
- Bare-throated tiger-heron, Tigrisoma mexicanum
- Great blue heron, Ardea herodias
- Great egret, Ardea alba
- Snowy egret, Egretta thula
- Little blue heron, Egretta caerulea
- Tricolored heron, Egretta tricolor
- Reddish egret, Egretta rufescens (near-threatened)
- Cattle egret, Bubulcus ibis
- Green heron, Butorides virescens
- Striated heron, Butorides striata (A)
- Agami heron, Agamia agami (vulnerable)
- Black-crowned night-heron, Nycticorax nycticorax
- Yellow-crowned night-heron, Nyctanassa violacea
- Boat-billed heron, Cochlearius cochlearius

== Ibises and spoonbills ==
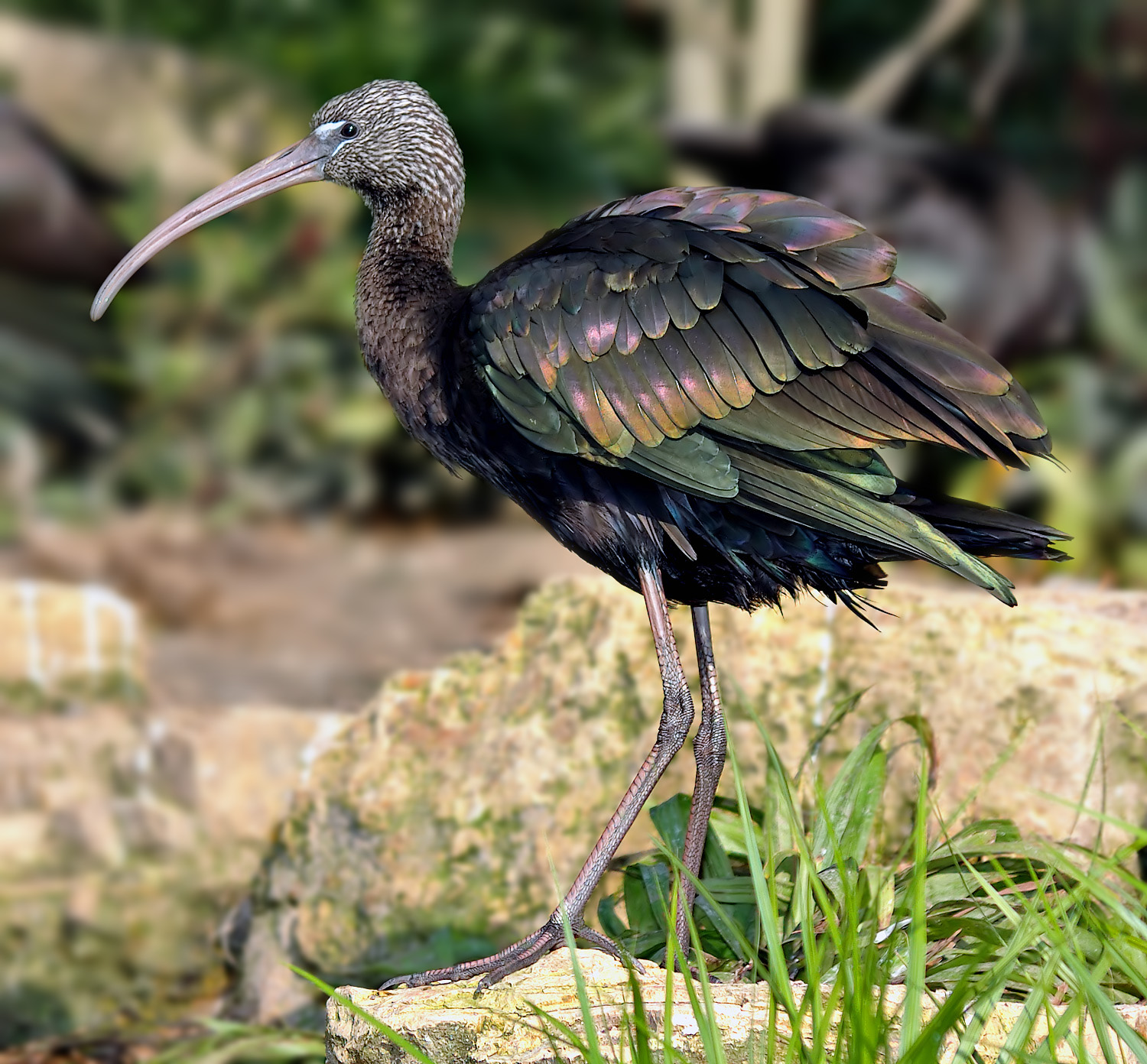
Glossy ibis

Order: Pelecaniformes Family: Threskiornithidae

Threskiornithidae is a family of large terrestrial and wading birds which includes the ibises and spoonbills. They have long, broad wings with 11 primary and about 20 secondary feathers. They are strong fliers and despite their size and weight, very capable soarers.

- White ibis, Eudocimus albus
- Glossy ibis, Plegadis falcinellus
- White-faced ibis, Plegadis chihi (A)
- Green ibis, Mesembrinibis cayennensis
- Roseate spoonbill, Platalea ajaja

== New World vultures ==
Order: Cathartiformes Family: Cathartidae

The New World vultures are not closely related to Old World vultures, but superficially resemble them because of convergent evolution. Like the Old World vultures, they are scavengers. However, unlike Old World vultures, which find carcasses by sight, New World vultures have a good sense of smell with which they locate carrion.

- King vulture, Sarcoramphus papa
- Black vulture, Coragyps atratus
- Turkey vulture, Cathartes aura
- Lesser yellow-headed vulture, Cathartes burrovianus

== Osprey ==
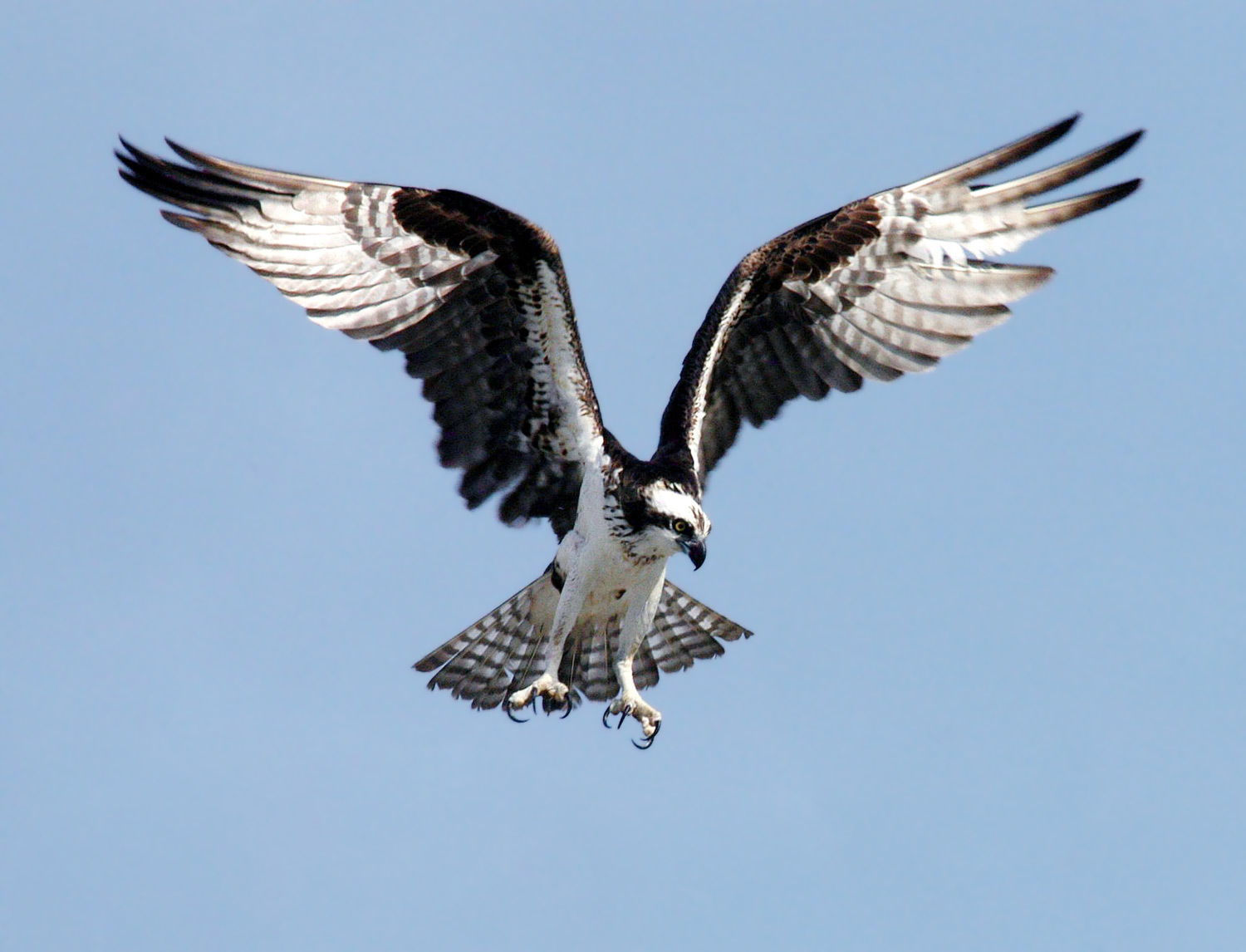
Osprey

Order: Accipitriformes Family: Pandionidae

The family Pandionidae contains only one species, the osprey. The osprey is a medium-large raptor which is a specialist fish-eater with a worldwide distribution.

- Osprey, Pandion haliaetus

== Hawks, eagles, and kites ==
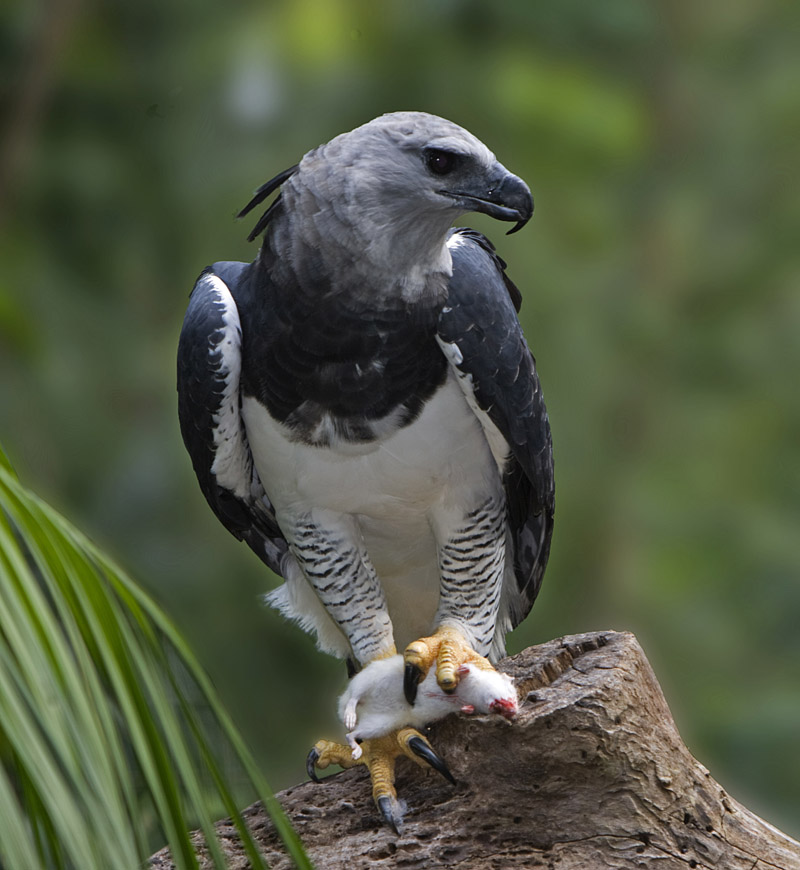
Harpy eagle

Order: Accipitriformes Family: Accipitridae

Accipitridae is a family of birds of prey, which includes hawks, eagles, kites, harriers, and Old World vultures. These birds have powerful hooked beaks for tearing flesh from their prey, strong legs, powerful talons, and keen eyesight.

- Pearl kite, Gampsonyx swainsonii
- White-tailed kite, Elanus leucurus
- Hook-billed kite, Chondrohierax uncinatus
- Gray-headed kite, Leptodon cayanensis
- Swallow-tailed kite, Elanoides forficatus
- Crested eagle, Morphnus guianensis (A) (near-threatened)
- Harpy eagle, Harpia harpyja (A) (near-threatened)
- Black hawk-eagle, Spizaetus tyrannus
- Black-and-white hawk-eagle, Spizaetus melanoleucus
- Ornate hawk-eagle, Spizaetus ornatus (near-threatened)
- Double-toothed kite, Harpagus bidentatus
- Northern harrier, Circus hudsonius
- Tiny hawk, Accipiter superciliosus (A)
- Sharp-shinned hawk, Accipiter striatus
- Cooper's hawk, Accipiter cooperii
- Bicolored hawk, Accipiter bicolor
- Mississippi kite, Ictinia mississippiensis
- Plumbeous kite, Ictinia plumbea
- Black-collared hawk, Busarellus nigricollis
- Crane hawk, Geranospiza caerulescens
- Snail kite, Rostrhamus sociabilis
- Common black hawk, Buteogallus anthracinus
- Savanna hawk, Buteogallus meridionalis (A)
- Great black hawk, Buteogallus urubitinga
- Solitary eagle, Buteogallus solitarius (near-threatened)
- Barred hawk, Morphnarchus princeps (A)
- Roadside hawk, Rupornis magnirostris
- Harris's hawk, Parabuteo unicinctus
- White-tailed hawk, Geranoaetus albicaudatus
- White hawk, Pseudastur albicollis
- Semiplumbeous hawk, Leucopternis semiplumbeus
- Gray hawk, Buteo plagiatus
- Broad-winged hawk, Buteo platypterus
- Short-tailed hawk, Buteo brachyurus
- Swainson's hawk, Buteo swainsoni
- Zone-tailed hawk, Buteo albonotatus
- Red-tailed hawk, Buteo jamaicensis

== Barn-owls ==
Order: Strigiformes Family: Tytonidae

Barn-owls are medium to large owls with large heads and characteristic heart-shaped faces. They have long strong legs with powerful talons.

- American barn owl, Tyto furcata

== Owls ==
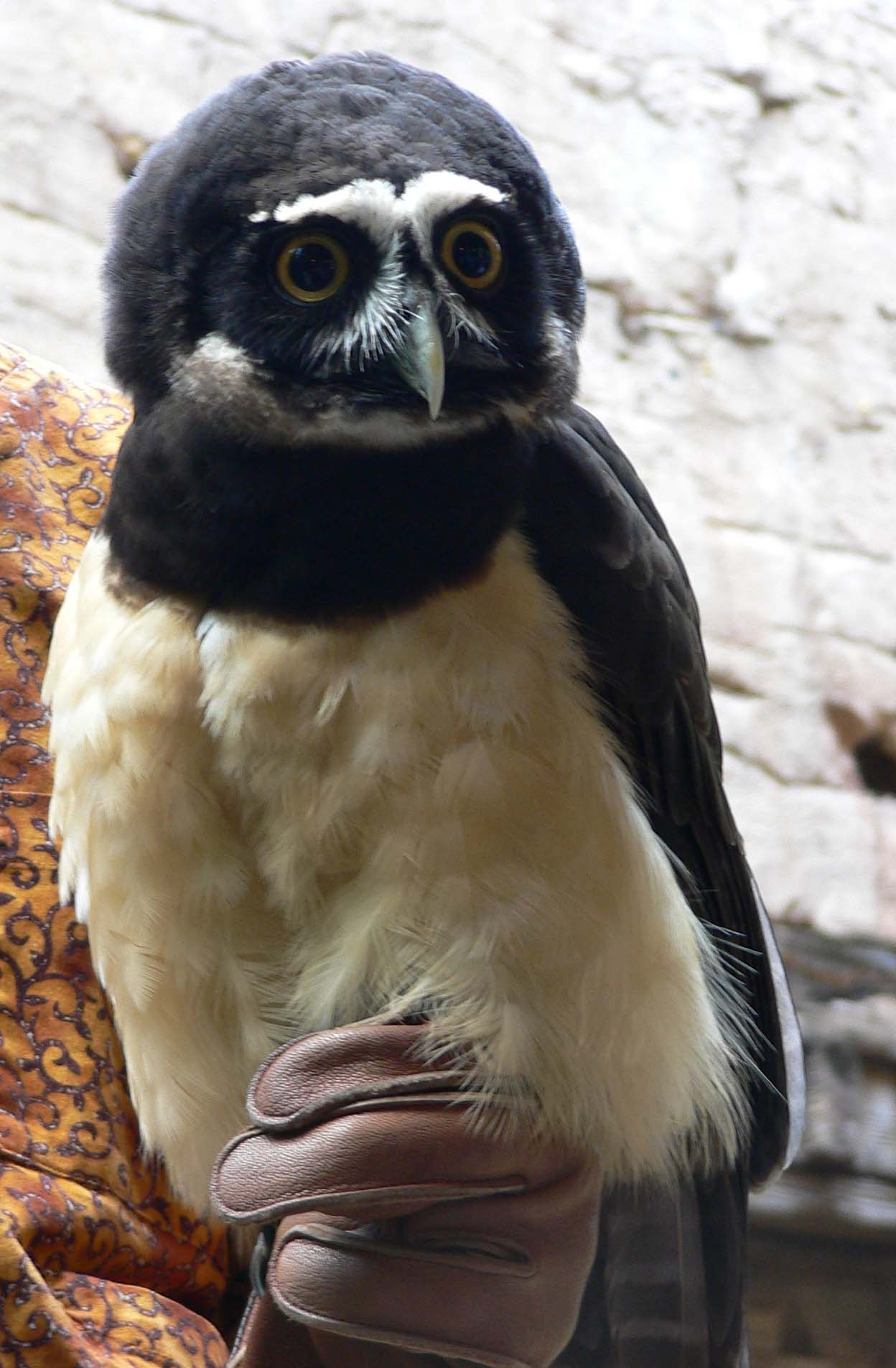
Spectacled owl

Order: Strigiformes Family: Strigidae

The typical owls are small to large solitary nocturnal birds of prey. They have large forward-facing eyes and ears, a hawk-like beak, and a conspicuous circle of feathers around each eye called a facial disk.

- Whiskered screech-owl, Megascops trichopsis (A)
- Pacific screech-owl, Megascops cooperi
- Middle-American screech-owl, Megascops guatemalae
- Crested owl, Lophostrix cristata
- Spectacled owl, Pulsatrix perspicillata
- Great horned owl, Bubo virginianus
- Northern pygmy-owl, Glaucidium gnoma
- Central American pygmy-owl, Glaucidium griseiceps
- Ferruginous pygmy-owl, Glaucidium brasilianum
- Burrowing owl, Athene cunicularia (A)
- Mottled owl, Strix virgata
- Black-and-white owl, Strix nigrolineata
- Stygian owl, Asio stygius
- Striped owl, Asio clamator (A)
- Short-eared owl, Asio flammeus (A)

== Trogons ==
Order: Trogoniformes Family: Trogonidae

The family Trogonidae includes trogons and quetzals. Found in tropical woodlands worldwide, they feed on insects and fruit, and their broad bills and weak legs reflect their diet and arboreal habits. Although their flight is fast, they are reluctant to fly any distance. Trogons have soft, often colorful, feathers with distinctive male and female plumages.

- Slaty-tailed trogon, Trogon massena
- Black-headed trogon, Trogon melanocephalus
- Gartered trogon, Trogon caligatus
- Northern black-throated trogon, Trogon tenellus
- Elegant trogon, Trogon elegans
- Collared trogon, Trogon collaris
- Resplendent quetzal, Pharomachrus mocinno (near-threatened)

== Motmots ==
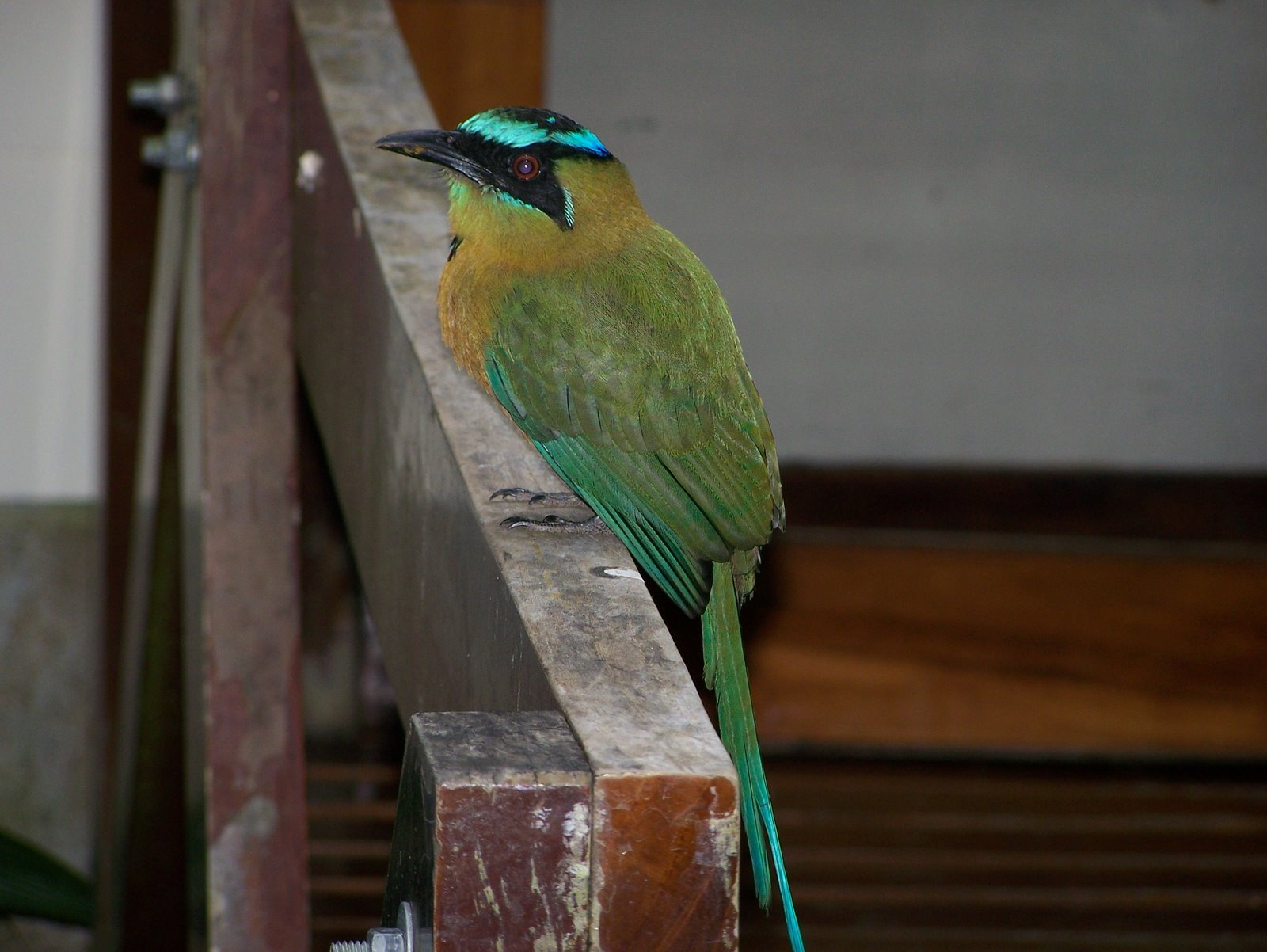
Lesson's motmot

Order: Coraciiformes Family: Momotidae

The motmots have colorful plumage and long, graduated tails which they display by waggling back and forth. In most of the species, the barbs near the ends of the two longest (central) tail feathers are weak and fall off, leaving a length of bare shaft and creating a racket-shaped tail.

- Tody motmot, Hylomanes momotula (A)
- Lesson's motmot, Momotus lessonii
- Rufous motmot, Baryphthengus martii
- Keel-billed motmot, Electron carinatum (vulnerable)
- Broad-billed motmot, Electron platyrhynchum
- Turquoise-browed motmot, Eumomota superciliosa

== Kingfishers ==
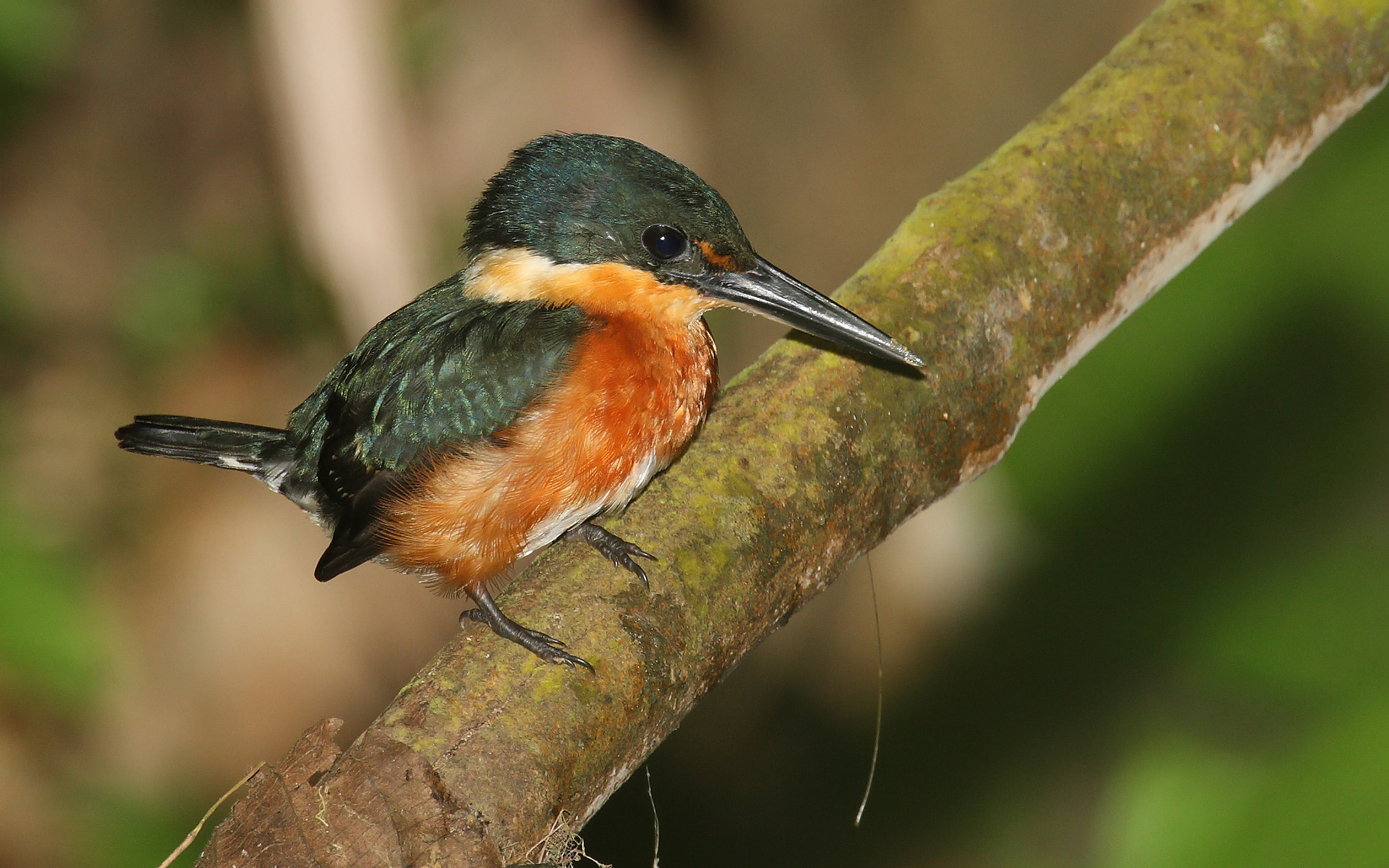
American pygmy kingfisher

Order: Coraciiformes Family: Alcedinidae

Kingfishers are medium-sized birds with large heads, long, pointed bills, short legs, and stubby tails.

- Ringed kingfisher, Megaceryle torquatus
- Belted kingfisher, Megaceryle alcyon
- Amazon kingfisher, Chloroceryle amazona
- American pygmy kingfisher, Chloroceryle aenea
- Green kingfisher, Chloroceryle americana
- Green-and-rufous kingfisher, Chloroceryle inda

== Puffbirds ==
Order: Piciformes Family: Bucconidae

The puffbirds are related to the jacamars and have the same range, but lack the iridescent colors of that family. They are mainly brown, rufous, or gray, with large heads and flattened bills with hooked tips. The loose abundant plumage and short tails makes them look stout and puffy, giving rise to the English common name of the family.

- White-necked puffbird, Notharchus hyperrhynchus
- Pied puffbird, Notharchus tectus
- White-whiskered puffbird, Malacoptila panamensis
- White-fronted nunbird, Monasa morphoeus

== Jacamars ==
Order: Piciformes Family: Galbulidae

The jacamars are near passerine birds from tropical South America with a range that extends up to Mexico. They feed on insects caught on the wing, and are glossy, elegant birds with long bills and tails. In appearance and behavior they resemble the Old World bee-eaters, although they are more closely related to puffbirds.

- Rufous-tailed jacamar, Galbula ruficauda
- Great jacamar, Jacamerops aureus

== Toucans ==
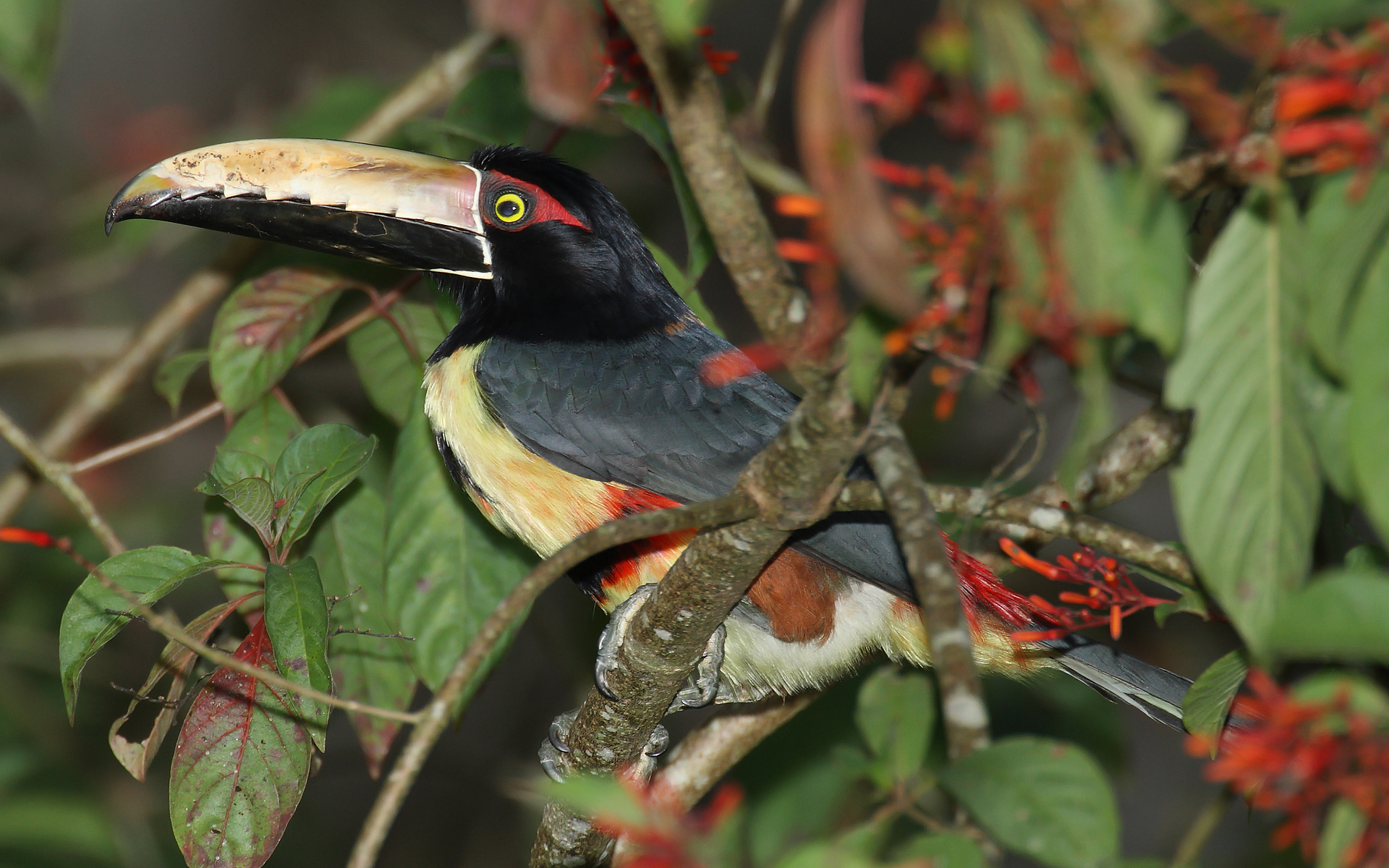
Collared aracari

Order: Piciformes Family: Ramphastidae

Toucans are near-passerine birds from the Neotropics. They are brightly marked and have enormous colorful bills which in some species amount to half their body length.

- Northern emerald-toucanet, Aulacorhynchus prasinus
- Collared aracari, Pteroglossus torquatus
- Yellow-eared toucanet, Selenidera spectabilis
- Yellow-throated toucan, Ramphastos ambiguus (near-threatened)
- Keel-billed toucan, Ramphastos sulfuratus

== Woodpeckers ==
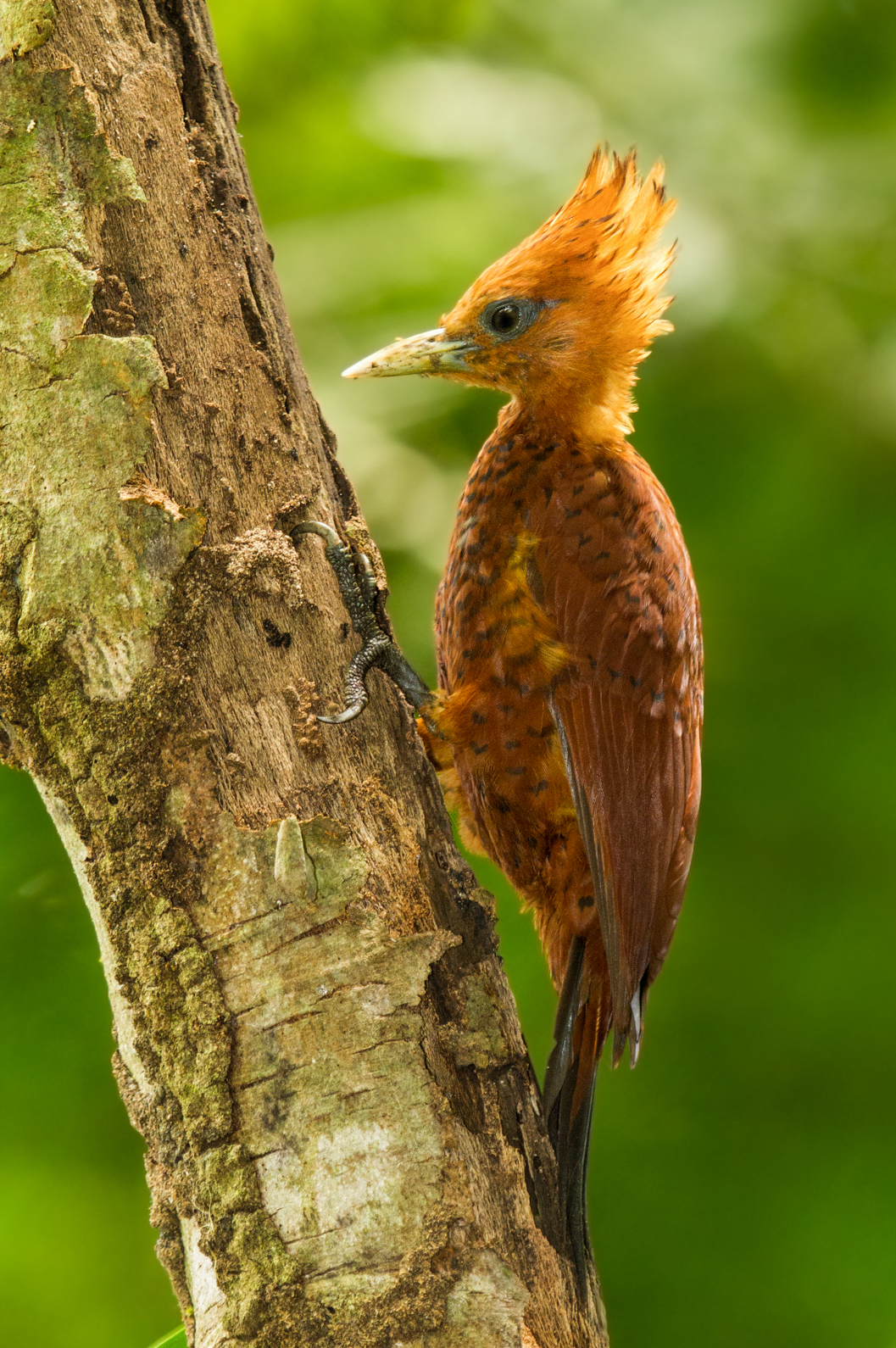
Chestnut-colored woodpecker

Order: Piciformes Family: Picidae

Woodpeckers are small to medium-sized birds with chisel-like beaks, short legs, stiff tails, and long tongues used for capturing insects. Some species have feet with two toes pointing forward and two backward, while several species have only three toes. Many woodpeckers have the habit of tapping noisily on tree trunks with their beaks.

- Olivaceous piculet, Picumnus olivaceus
- Acorn woodpecker, Melanerpes formicivorus
- Black-cheeked woodpecker, Melanerpes pucherani
- Hoffmann's woodpecker, Melanerpes hoffmannii
- Golden-fronted woodpecker, Melanerpes aurifrons
- Yellow-bellied sapsucker, Sphyrapicus varius
- Ladder-backed woodpecker, Dryobates scalaris
- Hairy woodpecker, Dryobates villosus
- Smoky-brown woodpecker, Dryobates fumigatus
- Rufous-winged woodpecker, Piculus simplex
- Golden-olive woodpecker, Piculus rubiginosus
- Guatemalan flicker, Colaptes mexicanoides
- Cinnamon woodpecker, Celeus loricatus (A)
- Chestnut-colored woodpecker, Celeus castaneus
- Lineated woodpecker, Dryocopus lineatus
- Pale-billed woodpecker, Campephilus guatemalensis

== Falcons and caracaras ==
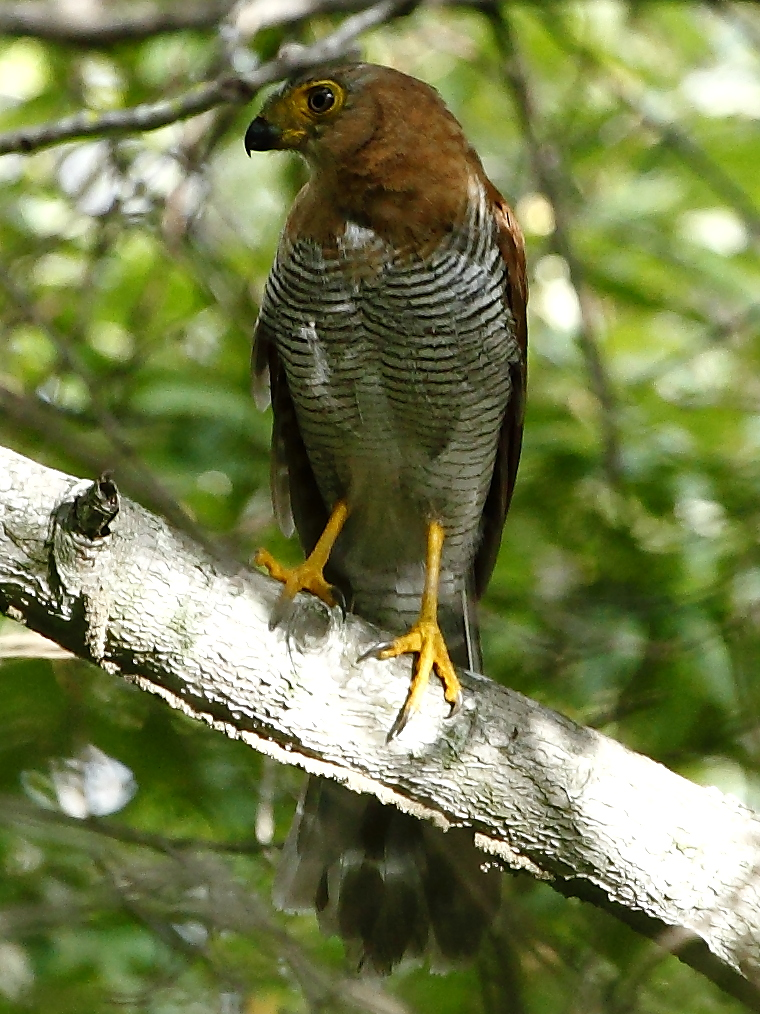
Barred forest-falcon

Order: Falconiformes Family: Falconidae

Falconidae is a family of diurnal birds of prey. They differ from hawks, eagles, and kites in that they kill with their beaks instead of their talons.

- Laughing falcon, Herpetotheres cachinnans
- Barred forest-falcon, Micrastur ruficollis
- Slaty-backed forest-falcon, Micrastur mirandollei (A)
- Collared forest-falcon, Micrastur semitorquatus
- Red-throated caracara, Ibycter americanus (A)
- Crested caracara, Caracara plancus
- Yellow-headed caracara, Milvago chimachima (A)
- American kestrel, Falco sparverius
- Merlin, Falco columbarius
- Aplomado falcon, Falco femoralis
- Bat falcon, Falco rufigularis
- Orange-breasted falcon, Falco deiroleucus (A) (near-threatened)
- Peregrine falcon, Falco peregrinus

== New World and African parrots ==
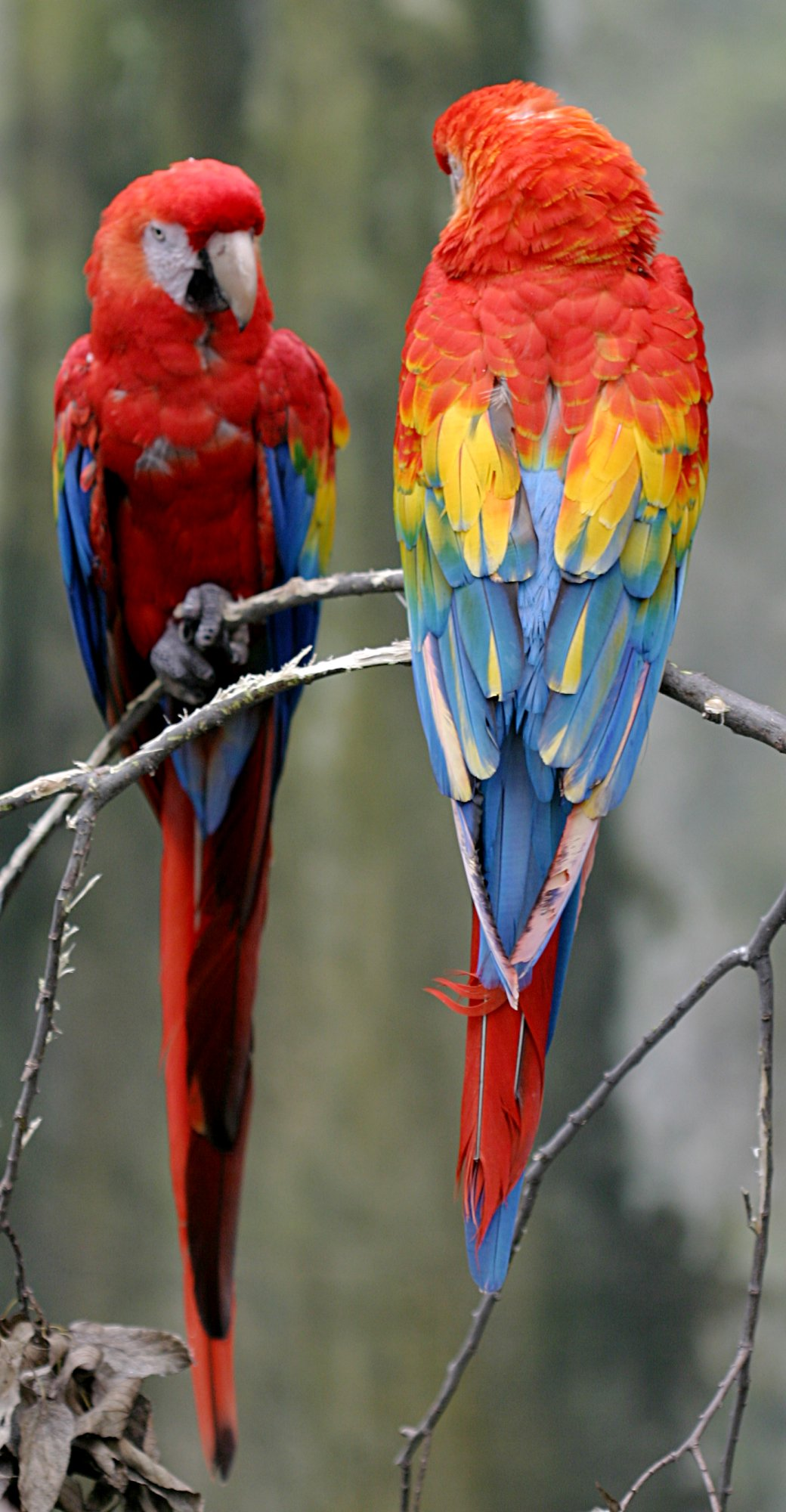
Scarlet macaw

Order: Psittaciformes Family: Psittacidae

Parrots are small to large birds with a characteristic curved beak. Their upper mandibles have slight mobility in the joint with the skull and they have a generally erect stance. All parrots are zygodactyl, having the four toes on each foot placed two at the front and two to the back.

- Olive-throated parakeet, Eupsittula nana
- Orange-fronted parakeet, Eupsittula canicularis
- Scarlet macaw, Ara macao
- Great green macaw, Ara ambigua (endangered)
- Green parakeet, Psittacara rubritorquis
- Pacific parakeet, Psittacara strenuus
- Crimson-fronted parakeet, Psittacara finschi
- Barred parakeet, Bolborhynchus lineola
- Orange-chinned parakeet, Brotogeris jugularis
- Brown-hooded parrot, Pionopsitta haematotis
- Blue-headed parrot, Pionus menstruus (A)
- White-crowned parrot, Pionus senilis
- White-fronted parrot, Amazona albifrons
- Red-lored parrot, Amazona autumnalis
- Mealy parrot, Amazona farinosa
- Yellow-headed parrot, Amazona oratrix (A) (endangered)
- Yellow-naped parrot, Amazona auropalliata (vulnerable)

== Typical antbirds ==
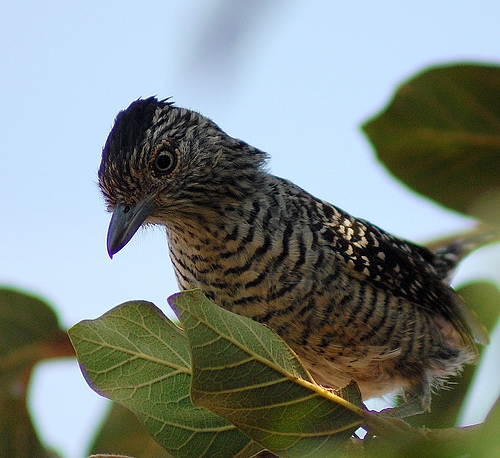
Barred antshrike

Order: Passeriformes Family: Thamnophilidae

The antbirds are a large family of small passerine birds of subtropical and tropical Central and South America. They are forest birds which tend to feed on insects at or near the ground. A sizable minority of them specialize in following columns of army ants to eat small invertebrates that leave their hiding places to flee from the ants. Many species lack bright color, with brown, black, and white being the dominant tones.

- Fasciated antshrike, Cymbilaimus lineatus
- Great antshrike, Taraba major
- Barred antshrike, Thamnophilus doliatus
- Black-crowned antshrike, Thamnophilus atrinucha
- Russet antshrike, Thamnistes anabatinus
- Plain antvireo, Dysithamnus mentalis
- Streak-crowned antvireo, Dysithamnus striaticeps
- White-flanked antwren, Myrmotherula axillaris
- Slaty antwren, Myrmotherula schisticolor
- Checker-throated stipplethroat, Myrmotherula fulviventris
- Dot-winged antwren, Microrhopias quixensis
- Dusky antbird, Cercomacroides tyrannina
- Bare-crowned antbird, Gymnocichla nudiceps
- Zeledon's antbird, Hafferia zeledoni (A)
- Chestnut-backed antbird, Poliocrania exsul
- Spotted antbird, Hylophylax naevioides
- Wing-banded antbird, Myrmornis torquata (near-threatened)
- Bicolored antbird, Gymnopithys bicolor
- Ocellated antbird, Phaenostictus mcleannani

== Antpittas ==
Order: Passeriformes Family: Grallariidae

Antpittas resemble the true pittas with strong, longish legs, very short tails, and stout bills.

- Scaled antpitta, Grallaria guatimalensis
- Streak-chested antpitta, Hylopezus perspicillatus (A)
- Thicket antpitta, Hylopezus dives

== Antthrushes ==
Order: Passeriformes Family: Formicariidae

Antthrushes resemble small rails with strong, longish legs, very short tails and stout bills.

- Black-faced antthrush, Formicarius analis

== Ovenbirds and woodcreepers ==
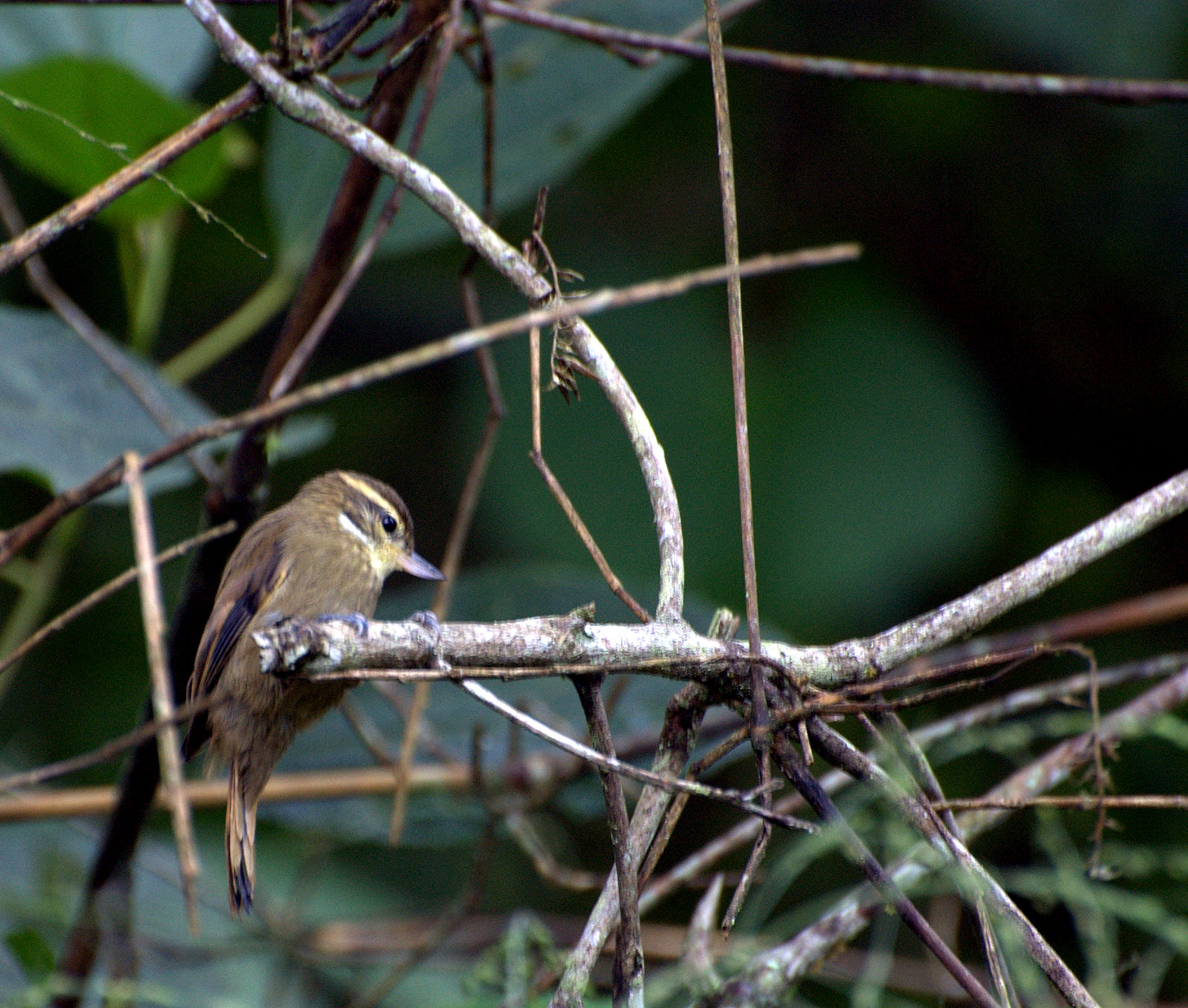
Plain xenops

Order: Passeriformes Family: Furnariidae

Ovenbirds comprise a large family of small sub-oscine passerine bird species found in Central and South America. They are a diverse group of insectivores which gets its name from the elaborate "oven-like" clay nests built by some species, although others build stick nests or nest in tunnels or clefts in rock. The woodcreepers are brownish birds which maintain an upright vertical posture supported by their stiff tail vanes. They feed mainly on insects taken from tree trunks.

- Middle American leaftosser, Sclerurus mexicanus
- Scaly-throated leaftosser, Sclerurus guatemalensis
- Olivaceous woodcreeper, Sittasomus griseicapillus
- Long-tailed woodcreeper, Deconychura longicauda (near-threatened)
- Ruddy woodcreeper, Dendrocincla homochroa
- Tawny-winged woodcreeper, Dendrocincla anabatina
- Plain-brown woodcreeper, Dendrocincla fuliginosa
- Wedge-billed woodcreeper, Glyphorynchus spirurus
- Northern barred-woodcreeper, Dendrocolaptes sanctithomae
- Black-banded woodcreeper, Dendrocolaptes picumnus (A)
- Strong-billed woodcreeper, Xiphocolaptes promeropirhynchus
- Cocoa woodcreeper, Xiphorhynchus susurrans
- Ivory-billed woodcreeper, Xiphorhynchus flavigaster
- Black-striped woodcreeper, Xiphorhynchus lachrymosus
- Spotted woodcreeper, Xiphorhynchus erythropygius
- Brown-billed scythebill, Campylorhamphus pusillus (A)
- Streak-headed woodcreeper, Lepidocolaptes souleyetii
- Spot-crowned woodcreeper, Lepidocolaptes affinis
- Plain xenops, Xenops minutus
- Streaked xenops, Xenops rutilans (A)
- Scaly-throated foliage-gleaner, Anabacerthia variegaticeps
- Ruddy foliage-gleaner, Clibanornis rubiginosus
- Buff-throated foliage-gleaner, Automolus ochrolaemus
- Striped woodhaunter, Automolus subulatus
- Slaty spinetail, Synallaxis brachyura

== Manakins ==
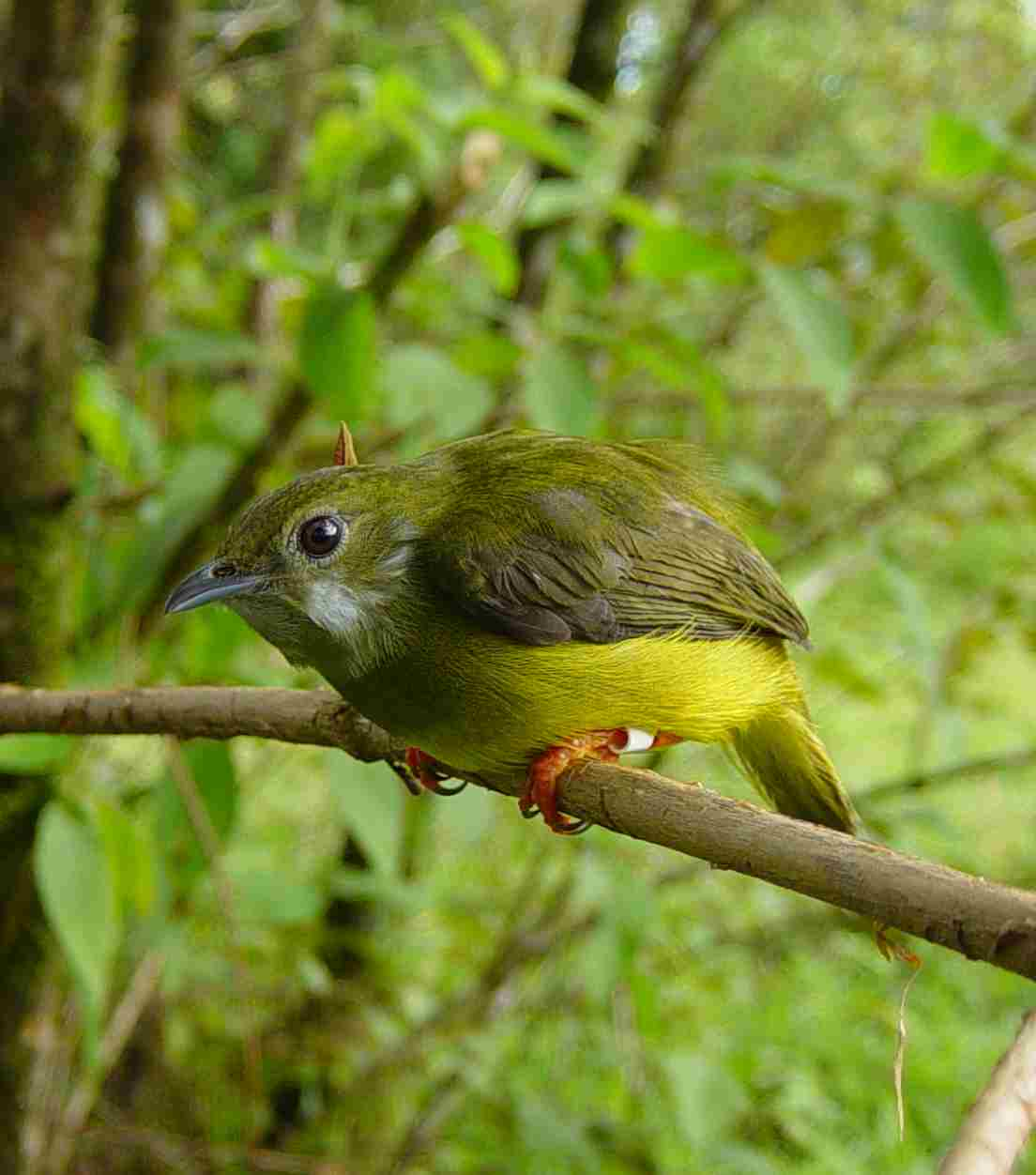
White-collared manakin

Order: Passeriformes Family: Pipridae

The manakins are a family of subtropical and tropical mainland Central American, South America, and Trinidad and Tobago. They are compact forest birds, the males typically being brightly colored, although the females of most species are duller and usually green-plumaged. Manakins feed on small fruits, berries, and insects.

- Long-tailed manakin, Chiroxiphia linearis
- White-ruffed manakin, Corapipo altera
- Blue-crowned manakin, Lepidothrix coronata (A)
- White-collared manakin, Manacus candei
- Red-capped manakin, Pipra mentalis

== Cotingas ==
Order: Passeriformes Family: Cotingidae

The cotingas are birds of forests or forest edges in tropical Central and South America. Comparatively little is known about this diverse group, although all have broad bills with hooked tips, rounded wings, and strong legs. The males of many of the species are brightly colored or decorated with plumes or wattles.

- Purple-throated fruitcrow, Querula purpurata
- Bare-necked umbrellabird, Cephalopterus glabricollis (A) (endangered)
- Lovely cotinga, Cotinga amabilis
- Rufous piha, Lipaugus unirufus
- Three-wattled bellbird, Procnias tricarunculata (vulnerable)
- Snowy cotinga, Carpodectes nitidus

== Tityras and allies ==
Order: Passeriformes Family: Tityridae

Tityridae is family of suboscine passerine birds found in forest and woodland in the Neotropics. The approximately 30 species in this family were formerly lumped with the families Pipridae and Cotingidae (see Taxonomy).

- Northern schiffornis, Schiffornis veraepacis
- Speckled mourner, Laniocera rufescens
- Masked tityra, Tityra semifasciata
- Black-crowned tityra, Tityra inquisitor
- Cinnamon becard, Pachyramphus cinnamomeus
- White-winged becard, Pachyramphus polychopterus
- Gray-collared becard, Pachyramphus major
- Rose-throated becard, Pachyramphus aglaiae

== Royal flycatcher and allies ==
Order: Passeriformes Family: Onychorhynchidae

The members of this small family, created in 2018, were formerly considered to be tyrant flycatchers, family Tyrannidae.

- Royal flycatcher, Onychorhynchus mexicanus
- Ruddy-tailed flycatcher, Terenotriccus erythrurus
- Sulphur-rumped flycatcher, Myiobius sulphureipygius

== Tyrant flycatchers ==
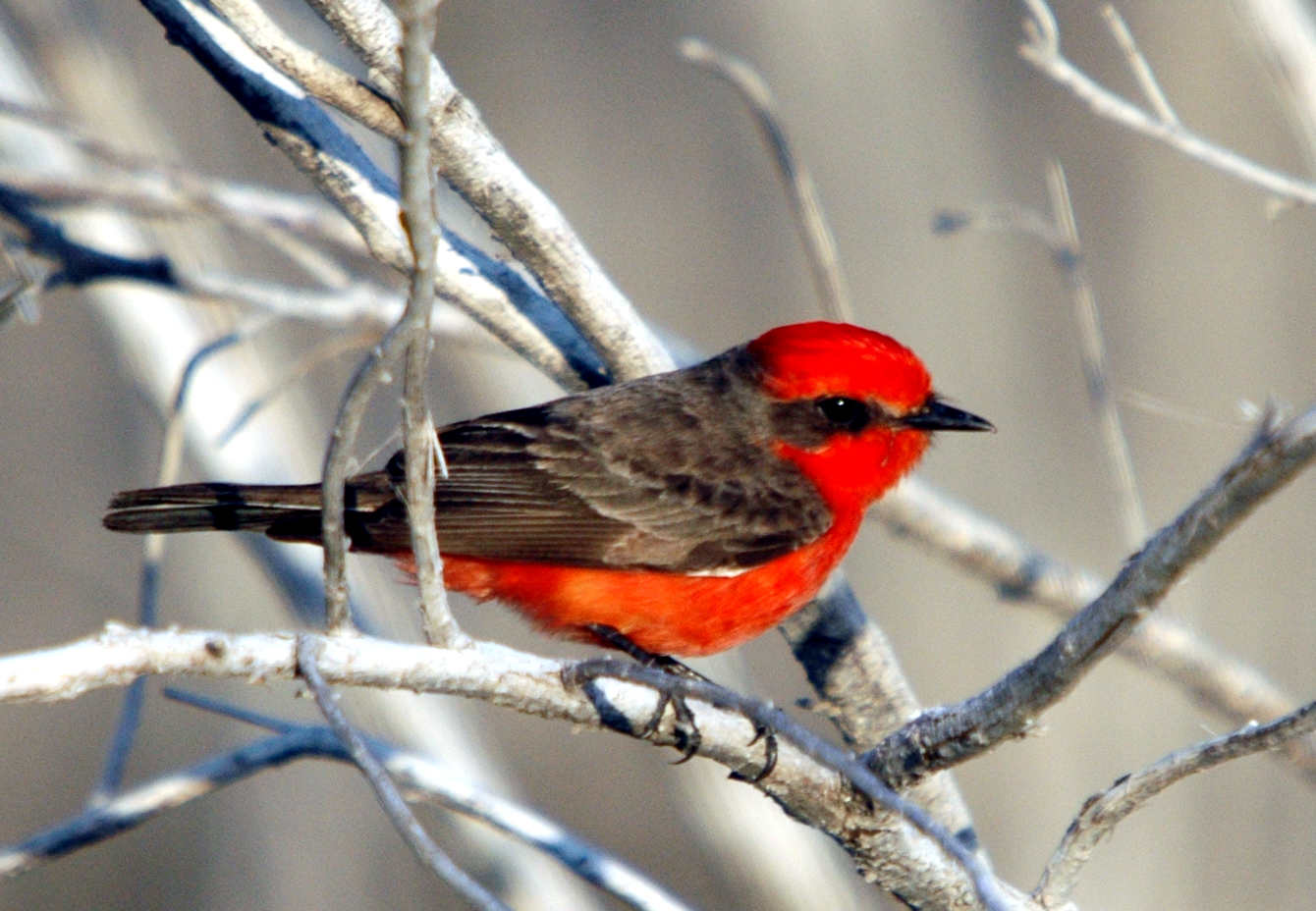
Vermilion flycatcher

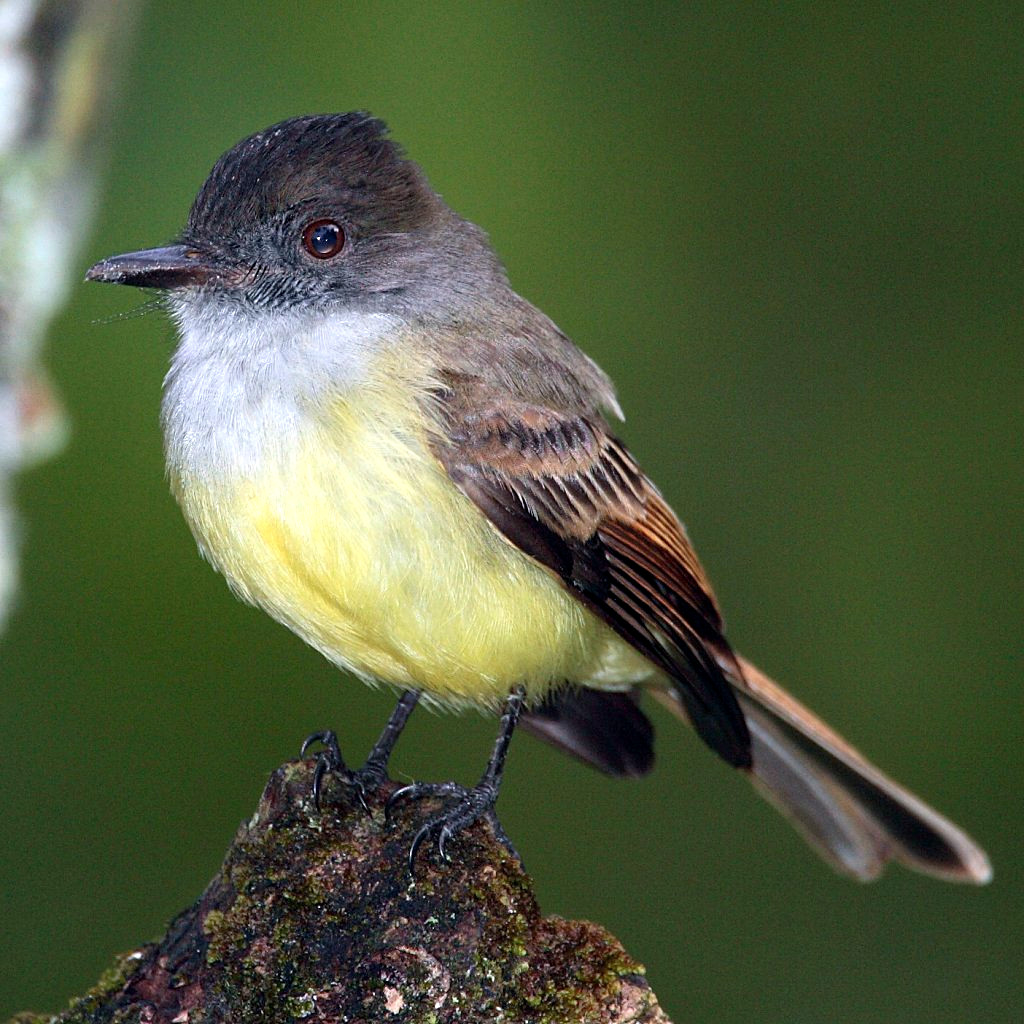
Dusky-capped flycatcher

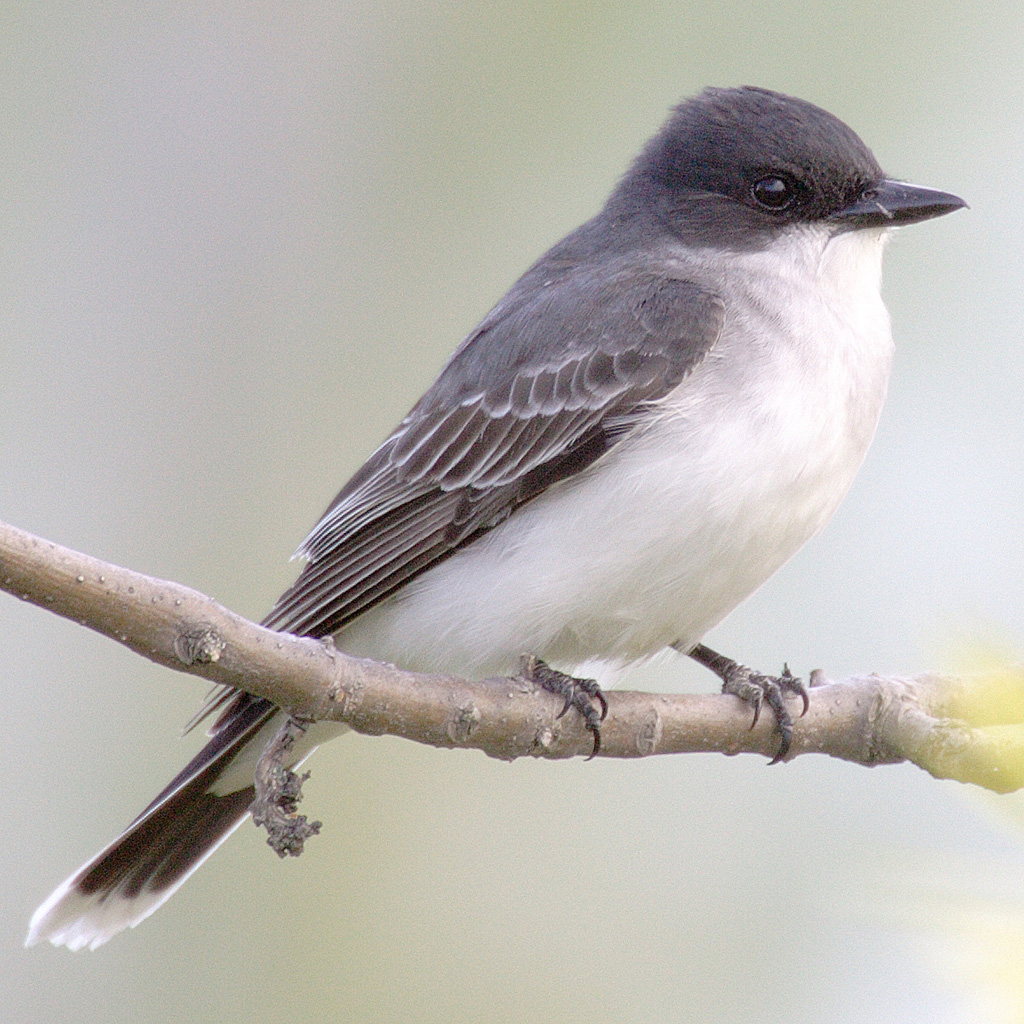
Eastern kingbird

Order: Passeriformes Family: Tyrannidae

Tyrant flycatchers are passerine birds which occur throughout North and South America. They superficially resemble the Old World flycatchers, but are more robust and have stronger bills. They do not have the sophisticated vocal capabilities of the songbirds. Most, but not all, have plain coloring. As the name implies, most are insectivorous.

- Gray-headed piprites, Piprites griseiceps (A)
- Stub-tailed spadebill, Platyrinchus cancrominus
- Golden-crowned spadebill, Platyrinchus coronatus
- Ochre-bellied flycatcher, Mionectes oleagineus
- Sepia-capped flycatcher, Leptopogon amaurocephalus
- Black-capped pygmy-tyrant, Myiornis atricapillus
- Scale-crested pygmy-tyrant, Lophotriccus pileatus (A)
- Northern bentbill, Oncostoma cinereigulare
- Slate-headed tody-flycatcher, Poecilotriccus sylvia
- Common tody-flycatcher, Todirostrum cinereum
- Black-headed tody-flycatcher, Todirostrum nigriceps (A)
- Eye-ringed flatbill, Rhynchocyclus brevirostris
- Yellow-olive flycatcher, Tolmomyias sulphurescens
- Yellow-margined flycatcher, Tolmomyias assimilis (A)
- Yellow-bellied tyrannulet, Ornithion semiflavum
- Brown-capped tyrannulet, Ornithion brunneicapillus (A)
- Northern beardless-tyrannulet, Camptostoma imberbe
- Yellow tyrannulet, Capsiempis flaveola
- Greenish elaenia, Myiopagis viridicata
- Yellow-bellied elaenia, Elaenia flavogaster
- Mountain elaenia, Elaenia frantzii
- Mistletoe tyrannulet, Zimmerius parvus
- Bright-rumped attila, Attila spadiceus
- Rufous mourner, Rhytipterna holerythra
- Dusky-capped flycatcher, Myiarchus tuberculifer
- Ash-throated flycatcher, Myiarchus cinerascens (A)
- Nutting's flycatcher, Myiarchus nuttingi
- Great crested flycatcher, Myiarchus crinitus
- Brown-crested flycatcher, Myiarchus tyrannulus
- Great kiskadee, Pitangus sulphuratus
- Boat-billed flycatcher, Megarynchus pitangua
- Social flycatcher, Myiozetetes similis
- Gray-capped flycatcher, Myiozetetes granadensis
- White-ringed flycatcher, Conopias albovittatus
- Streaked flycatcher, Myiodynastes maculatus
- Sulphur-bellied flycatcher, Myiodynastes luteiventris
- Piratic flycatcher, Legatus leucophaius
- Tropical kingbird, Tyrannus melancholicus
- Cassin's kingbird, Tyrannus vociferans (A)
- Western kingbird, Tyrannus verticalis
- Eastern kingbird, Tyrannus tyrannus
- Gray kingbird, Tyrannus dominicensis (A)
- Loggerhead kingbird, Tyrannus caudifasciatus (A)
- Scissor-tailed flycatcher, Tyrannus forficatus
- Fork-tailed flycatcher, Tyrannus savana
- Tawny-chested flycatcher, Aphanotriccus capitalis (vulnerable)
- Tufted flycatcher, Mitrephanes phaeocercus
- Olive-sided flycatcher, Contopus cooperi (near-threatened)
- Greater pewee, Contopus pertinax
- Western wood-pewee, Contopus sordidulus
- Eastern wood-pewee, Contopus virens
- Tropical pewee, Contopus cinereus
- Yellow-bellied flycatcher, Empidonax flaviventris
- Acadian flycatcher, Empidonax virescens
- Alder flycatcher, Empidonax alnorum
- Willow flycatcher, Empidonax traillii
- White-throated flycatcher, Empidonax albigularis
- Least flycatcher, Empidonax minimus
- Hammond's flycatcher, Empidonax hammondii
- Yellowish flycatcher, Empidonax flavescens
- Buff-breasted flycatcher, Empidonax fulvifrons (A)
- Black phoebe, Sayornis nigricans
- Vermilion flycatcher, Pyrocephalus rubinus
- Long-tailed tyrant, Colonia colonus

== Vireos, shrike-babblers, and erpornis ==
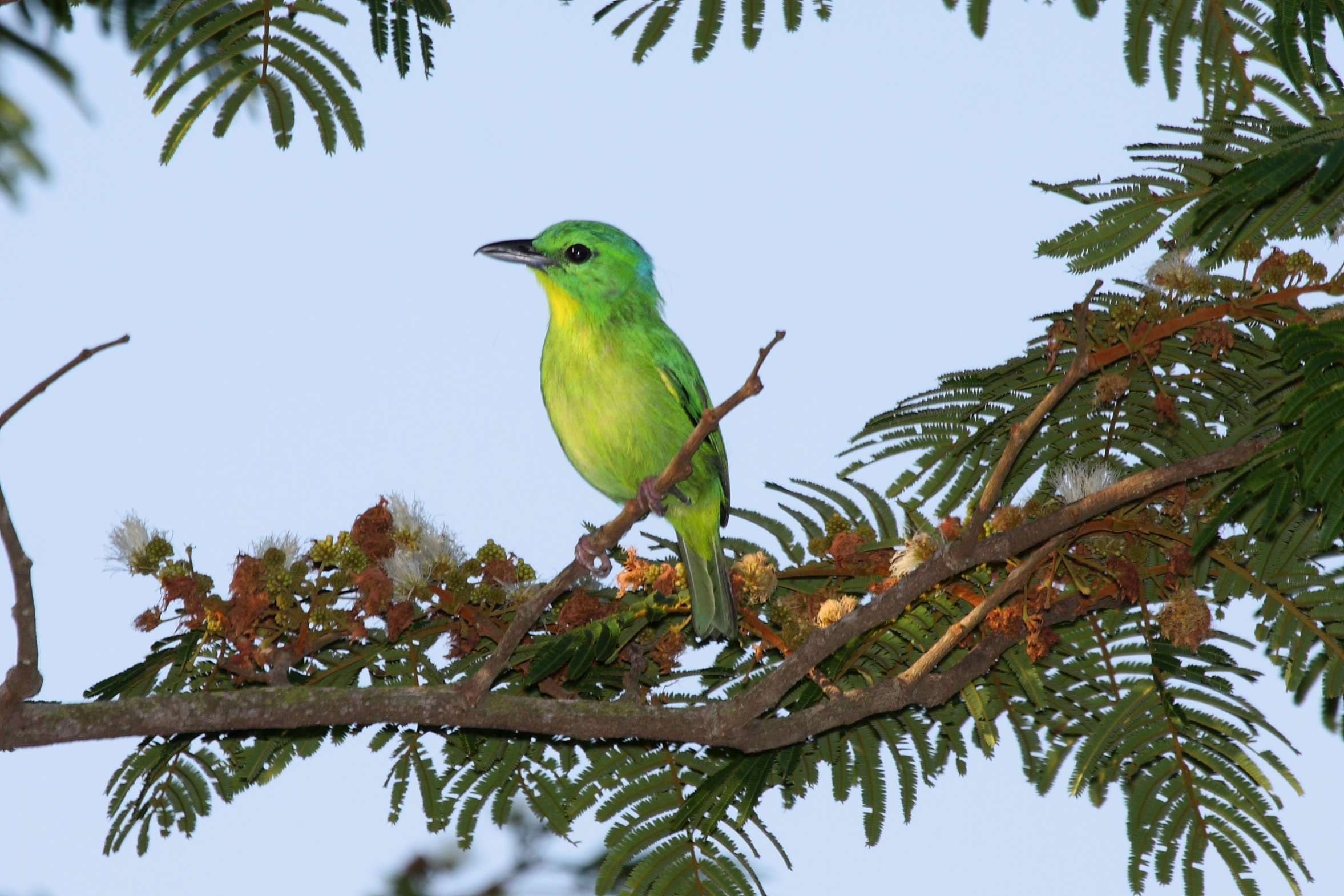
Green shrike-vireo

Order: Passeriformes Family: Vireonidae

The vireos are a group of small to medium-sized passerine birds. They are typically greenish in color and resemble wood-warblers apart from their heavier bills.

- Rufous-browed peppershrike, Cyclarhis gujanensis
- Scrub greenlet, Hylophilus flavipes (A)
- Green shrike-vireo, Vireolanius pulchellus
- Tawny-crowned greenlet, Tunchiornis ochraceiceps
- Lesser greenlet, Pachysylvia decurtata
- White-eyed vireo, Vireo griseus (A)
- Mangrove vireo, Vireo pallens
- Bell's vireo, Vireo bellii (A)
- Yellow-throated vireo, Vireo flavifrons
- Blue-headed vireo, Vireo solitarius
- Plumbeous vireo, Vireo plumbeus
- Philadelphia vireo, Vireo philadelphicus
- Warbling vireo, Vireo gilvus
- Brown-capped vireo, Vireo leucophrys (A)
- Red-eyed vireo, Vireo olivaceus
- Yellow-green vireo, Vireo flavoviridis

== Crows, jays, and magpies ==
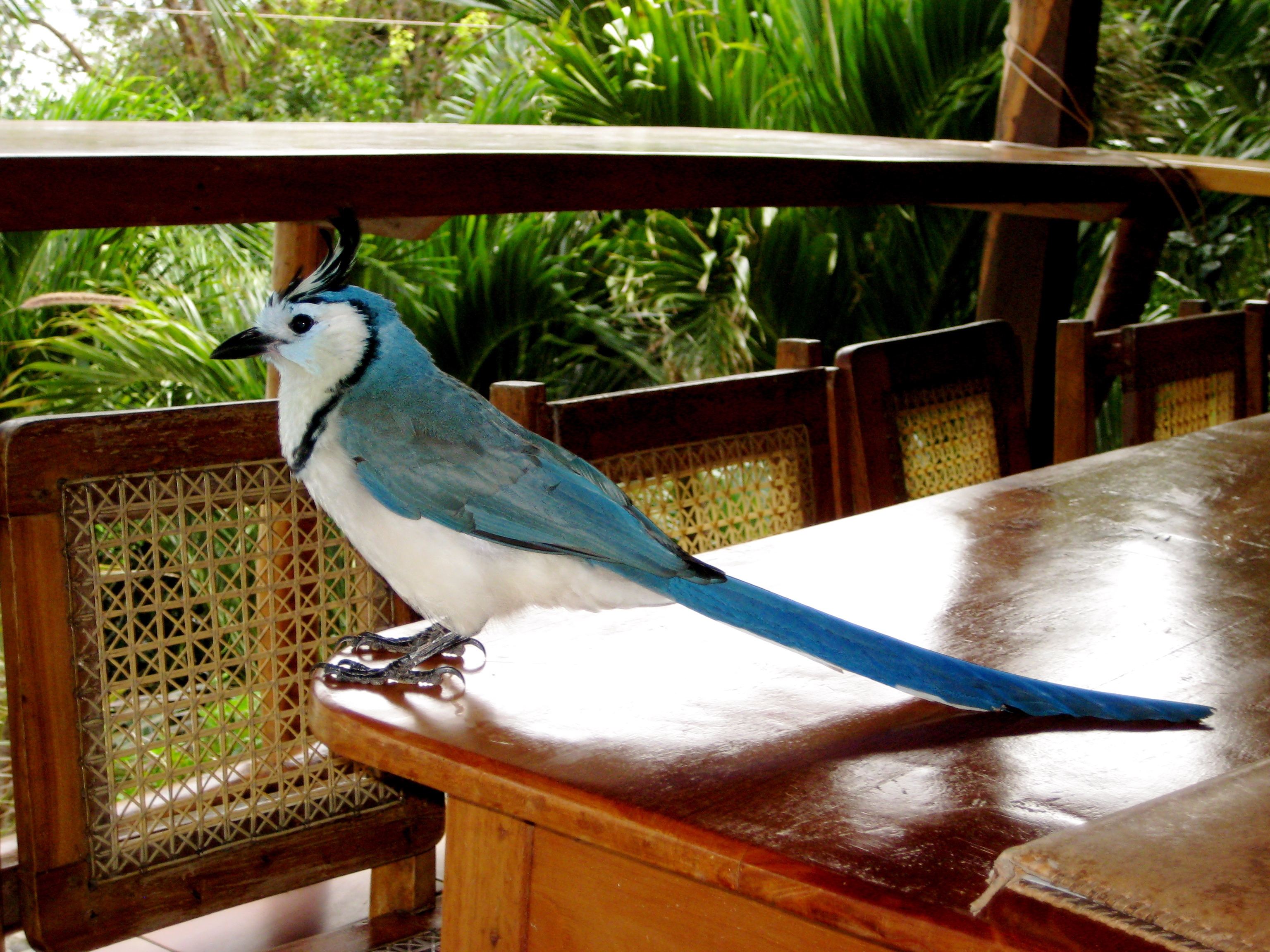
White-throated magpie-jay

Order: Passeriformes Family: Corvidae

The family Corvidae includes crows, ravens, jays, choughs, magpies, treepies, nutcrackers, and ground jays. Corvids are above average in size among the Passeriformes, and some of the larger species show high levels of intelligence.

- White-throated magpie-jay, Calocitta formosa
- Brown jay, Psilorhinus morio
- Bushy-crested jay, Cyanocorax melanocyaneus
- Steller's jay, Cyanocitta stelleri
- Unicolored jay, Aphelocoma unicolor (A)
- Common raven, Corvus corax (A)

== Swallows ==
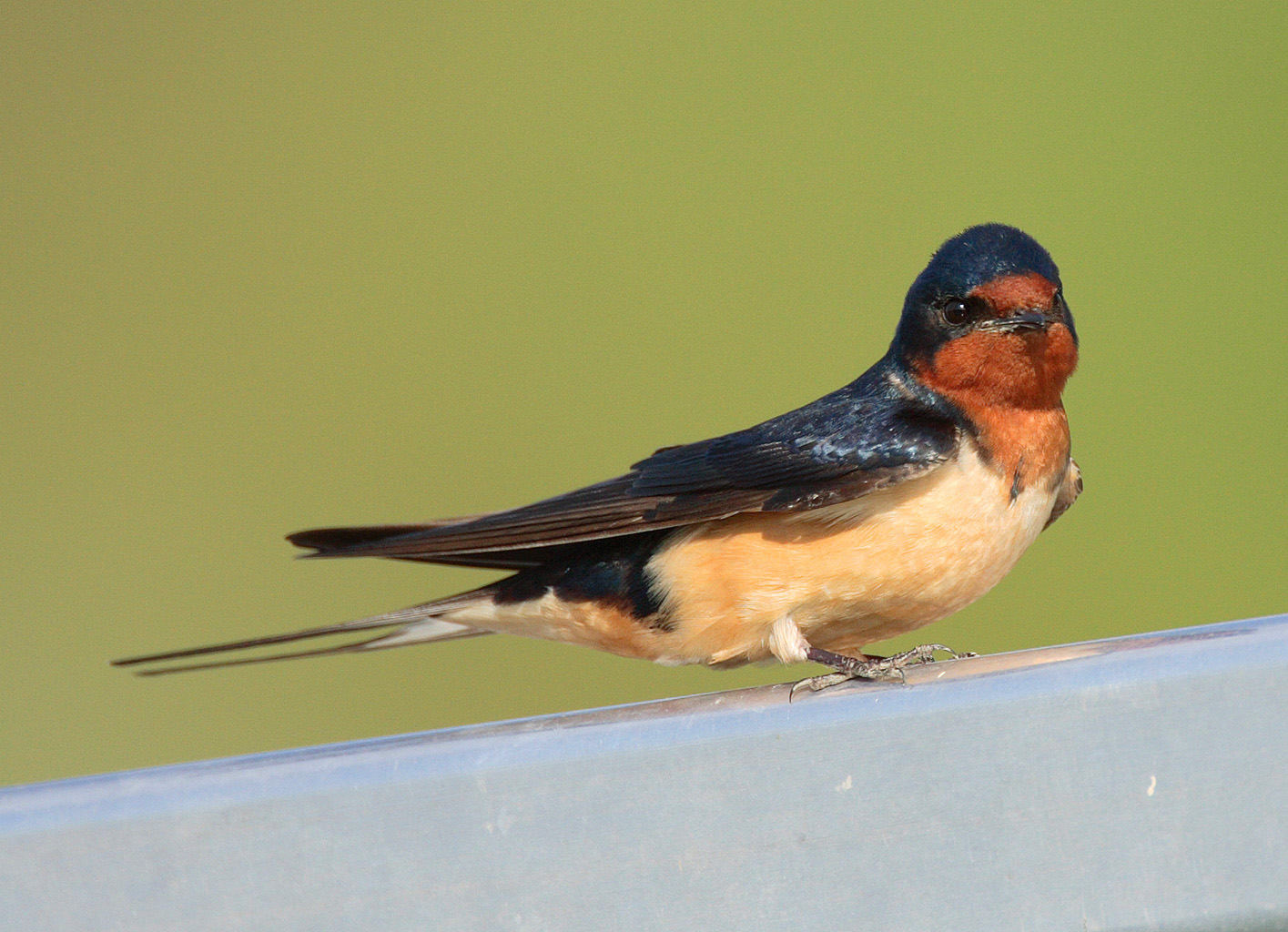
Barn swallow

Order: Passeriformes Family: Hirundinidae

The family Hirundinidae is adapted to aerial feeding. They have a slender streamlined body, long pointed wings, and a short bill with a wide gape. The feet are adapted to perching rather than walking, and the front toes are partially joined at the base.

- Bank swallow, Riparia riparia
- Tree swallow, Tachycineta bicolor
- Violet-green swallow, Tachycineta thalassina (A)
- Mangrove swallow, Tachycineta albilinea
- Blue-and-white swallow, Notiochelidon cyanoleuca (A)
- Northern rough-winged swallow, Stelgidopteryx serripennis
- Southern rough-winged swallow, Stelgidopteryx ruficollis
- Purple martin, Progne subis
- Gray-breasted martin, Progne chalybea
- Sinaloa martin, Progne sinaloae (A) (vulnerable)
- Barn swallow, Hirundo rustica
- Cliff swallow, Petrochelidon pyrrhonota
- Cave swallow, Petrochelidon fulva (A)

== Treecreepers ==
Order: Passeriformes Family: Certhiidae

Treecreepers are small woodland birds, brown above and white below. They have thin pointed down-curved bills, which they use to extricate insects from bark. They have stiff tail feathers, like woodpeckers, which they use to support themselves on vertical trees.

- Brown creeper, Certhia americana

== Gnatcatchers ==
Order: Passeriformes Family: Polioptilidae

These dainty birds resemble Old World warblers in their build and habits, moving restlessly through the foliage seeking insects. The gnatcatchers and gnatwrens are mainly soft bluish gray in color and have the typical insectivore's long sharp bill. They are birds of fairly open woodland or scrub which nest in bushes or trees.

- Long-billed gnatwren, Ramphocaenus melanurus
- Tawny-faced gnatwren, Microbates cinereiventris (A)
- White-browed gnatcatcher, Polioptila bilineata
- Blue-gray gnatcatcher, Polioptila caerulea
- White-lored gnatcatcher, Polioptila albiloris

== Wrens ==
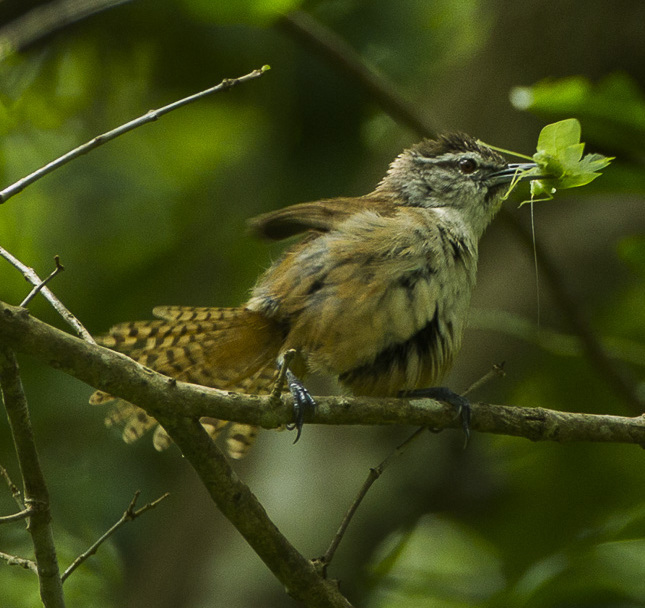
Cabanis's wren

Order: Passeriformes Family: Troglodytidae

The wrens are mainly small and inconspicuous except for their loud songs. These birds have short wings and thin down-turned bills. Several species often hold their tails upright. All are insectivorous.

- Rock wren, Salpinctes obsoletus
- Nightingale wren, Microcerculus philomela
- House wren, Troglodytes aedon
- Rufous-browed wren, Troglodytes rufociliatus
- Grass wren, Cistothorus platensis (A)
- Carolina wren, Thryothorus ludovicianus
- Band-backed wren, Campylorhynchus zonatus
- Rufous-naped wren, Campylorhynchus rufinucha
- Black-throated wren, Pheugopedius atrogularis
- Spot-breasted wren, Pheugopedius maculipectus
- Rufous-and-white wren, Thryophilus rufalbus
- Banded wren, Thryophilus pleurostictus
- Stripe-breasted wren, Cantorchilus thoracicus
- Cabanis's wren, Cantorchilus modestus
- Canebrake wren, Cantorchilus zeledoni
- Bay wren, Cantorchilus nigricapillus
- White-breasted wood-wren, Henicorhina leucosticta
- Gray-breasted wood-wren, Henicorhina leucophrys (A)
- Song wren, Cyphorhinus phaeocephalus

== Dippers ==
Order: Passeriformes Family: Cinclidae

Dippers are a group of perching birds whose habitat includes aquatic environments in the Americas, Europe, and Asia. They are named for their bobbing or dipping movements.

- American dipper, Cinclus mexicanus

== Thrushes and allies ==
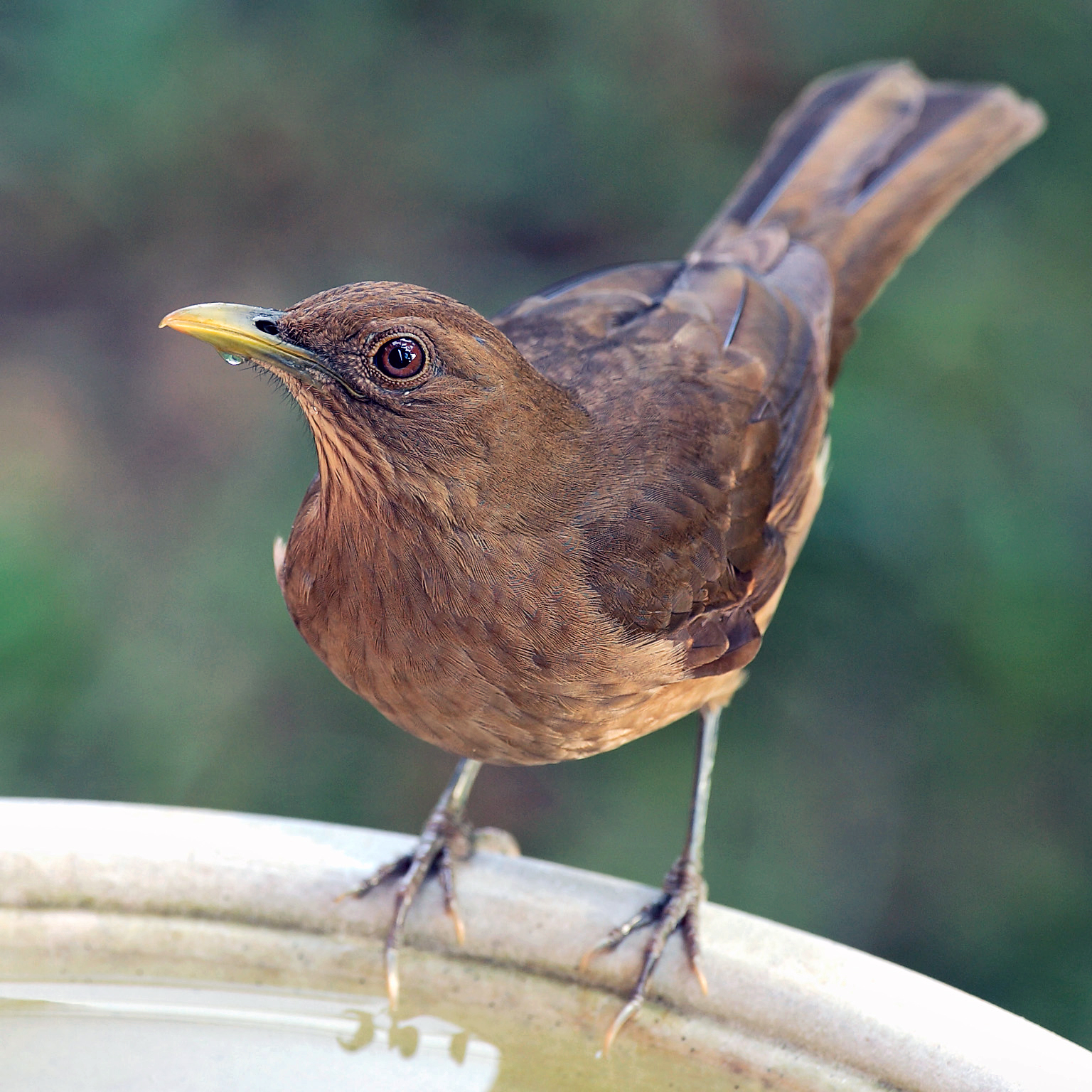
Clay-colored thrush

Order: Passeriformes Family: Turdidae

The thrushes are a group of passerine birds that occur mainly in the Old World. They are plump, soft plumaged, small to medium-sized insectivores or sometimes omnivores, often feeding on the ground. Many have attractive songs.

- Eastern bluebird, Sialia sialis
- Slate-colored solitaire, Myadestes unicolor
- Orange-billed nightingale-thrush, Catharus aurantiirostris
- Ruddy-capped nightingale-thrush, Catharus frantzii
- Black-headed nightingale-thrush, Catharus mexicanus
- Yellow-throated nightingale-thrush, Catharus dryas (A)
- Veery, Catharus fuscescens
- Gray-cheeked thrush, Catharus minimus
- Swainson's thrush, Catharus ustulatus
- Wood thrush, Hylocichla mustelina (near-threatened)
- Black thrush, Turdus infuscatus (A)
- Mountain thrush, Turdus plebejus
- Clay-colored thrush, Turdus grayi
- White-throated thrush, Turdus assimilis
- Rufous-backed robin, Turdus rufopalliatus (A)

== Mockingbirds and thrashers ==
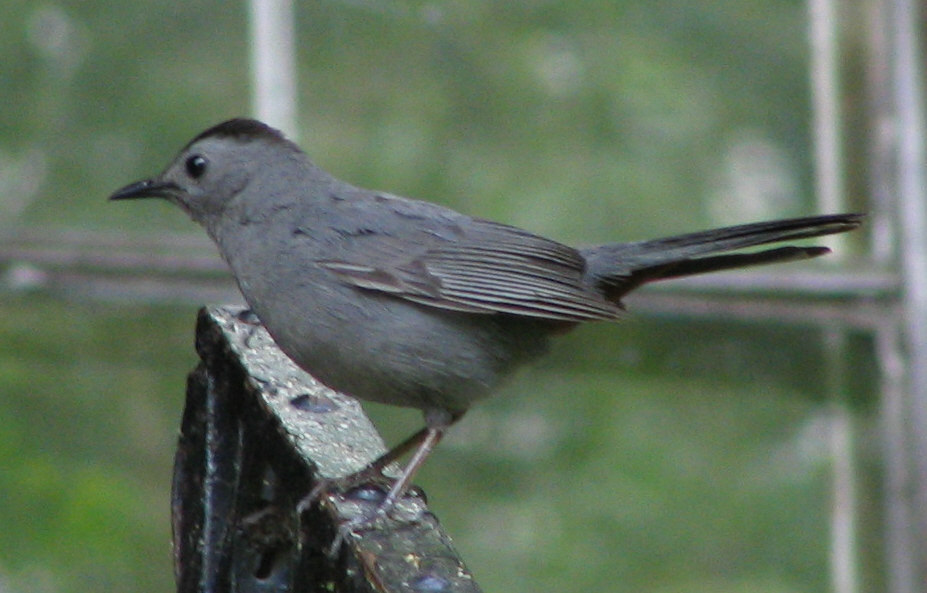
Gray catbird

Order: Passeriformes Family: Mimidae

The mimids are a family of passerine birds that includes thrashers, mockingbirds, tremblers, and the New World catbirds. These birds are notable for their vocalizations, especially their ability to mimic a wide variety of birds and other sounds heard outdoors. Their coloring tends towards dull-grays and browns.

- Blue-and-white mockingbird, Melanotis hypoleucus
- Gray catbird, Dumetella carolinensis
- Tropical mockingbird, Mimus gilvus
- Northern mockingbird, Mimus polyglottos (A)

== Waxwings ==
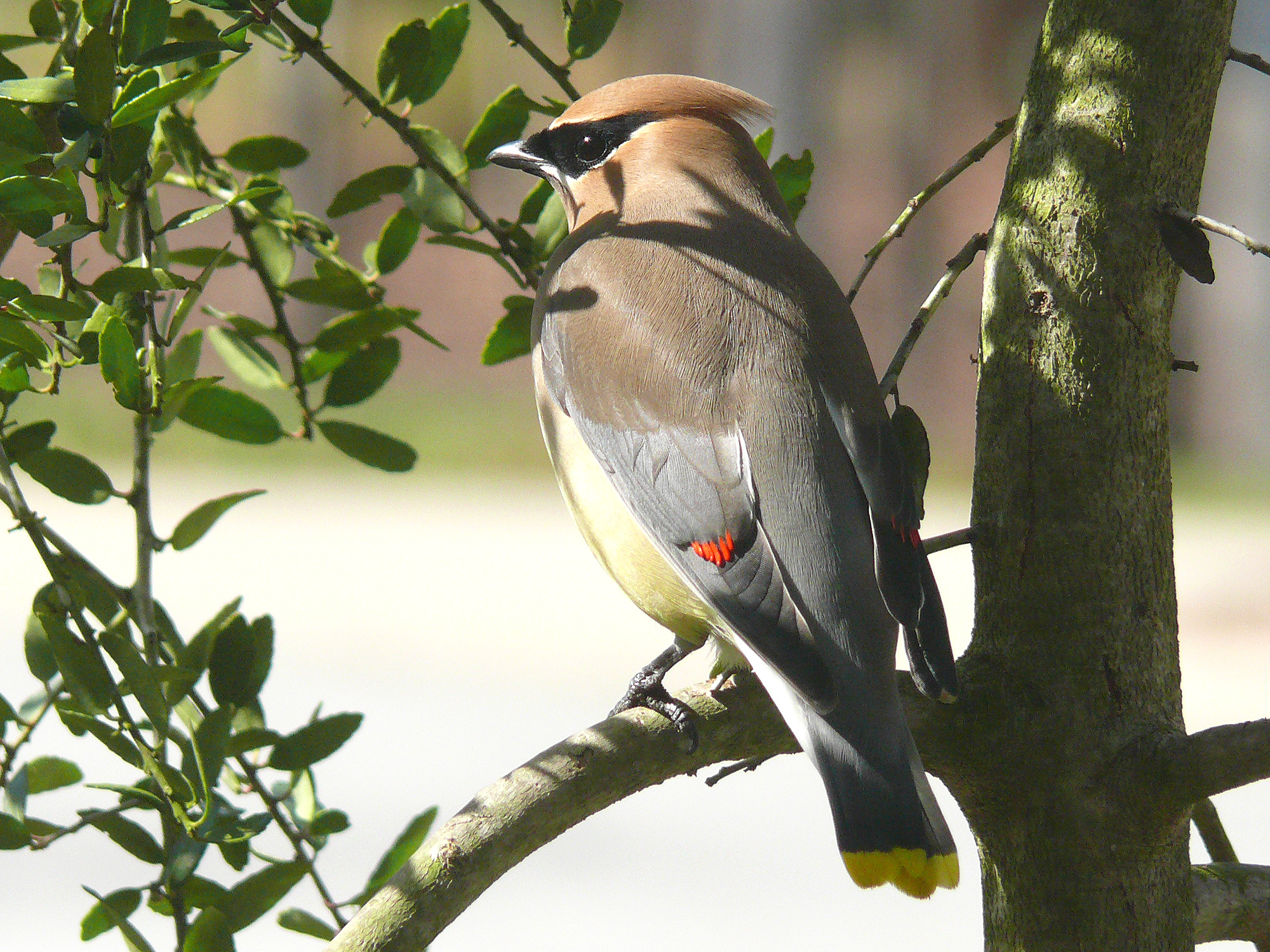
Cedar waxwing

Order: Passeriformes Family: Bombycillidae

The waxwings are a group of birds with soft silky plumage and unique red tips to some of the wing feathers. In the Bohemian and cedar waxwings, these tips look like sealing wax and give the group its name. These are arboreal birds of northern forests. They live on insects in summer and berries in winter.

- Cedar waxwing, Bombycilla cedrorum

== Olive warbler ==
Order: Passeriformes Family: Peucedramidae

The olive warbler is a small passerine bird, the only member of the family Peucedramidae. It is a long-winged bird with a gray body and wings with some olive-green and two white bars. The male's head and breast are orange, the female's yellow.

- Olive warbler, Peucedramus taeniatus

== Waxbills and allies ==
Order: Passeriformes Family: Estrildidae

The members of this family are small passerine birds native to the Old World tropics. They are gregarious and often colonial seed eaters with short thick but pointed bills. They are all similar in structure and habits, but have wide variation in plumage colors and patterns.

- Tricolored munia, Lonchura malacca (I)

== Old World sparrows ==
Order: Passeriformes Family: Passeridae

Sparrows are small passerine birds. In general, sparrows tend to be small, plump, brown or gray birds with short tails and short powerful beaks. Sparrows are seed eaters, but they also consume small insects.

- House sparrow, Passer domesticus (I)

== Finches, euphonias, and allies ==
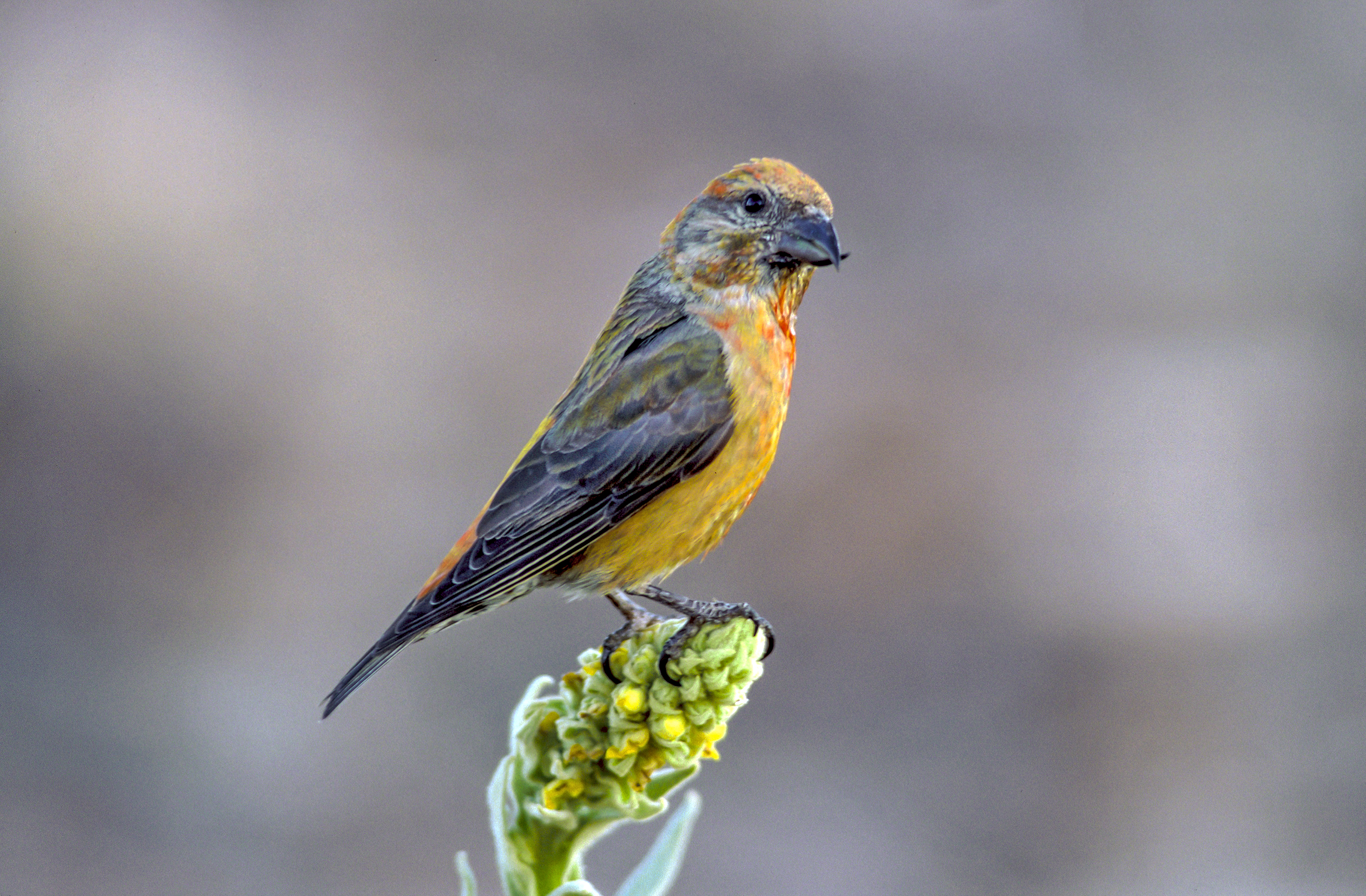
Red crossbill

Order: Passeriformes Family: Fringillidae

Finches are seed-eating passerine birds that are small to moderately large and have a strong beak, usually conical, and in some species very large. All have twelve tail feathers and nine primaries. These birds have a bouncing flight with alternating bouts of flapping and gliding on closed wings, and most sing well.

- Elegant euphonia, Chlorophonia elegantissima
- Blue-crowned chlorophonia, Chlorophonia occipitalis
- Golden-browed chlorophonia, Chlorophonia callophrys (A)
- Scrub euphonia, Euphonia affinis
- Yellow-crowned euphonia, Euphonia luteicapilla
- White-vented euphonia, Euphonia minuta
- Yellow-throated euphonia, Euphonia hirundinacea
- Olive-backed euphonia, Euphonia gouldi
- Red crossbill, Loxia curvirostra
- Black-headed siskin, Spinus notata
- Lesser goldfinch, Spinus psaltria

== New World sparrows ==
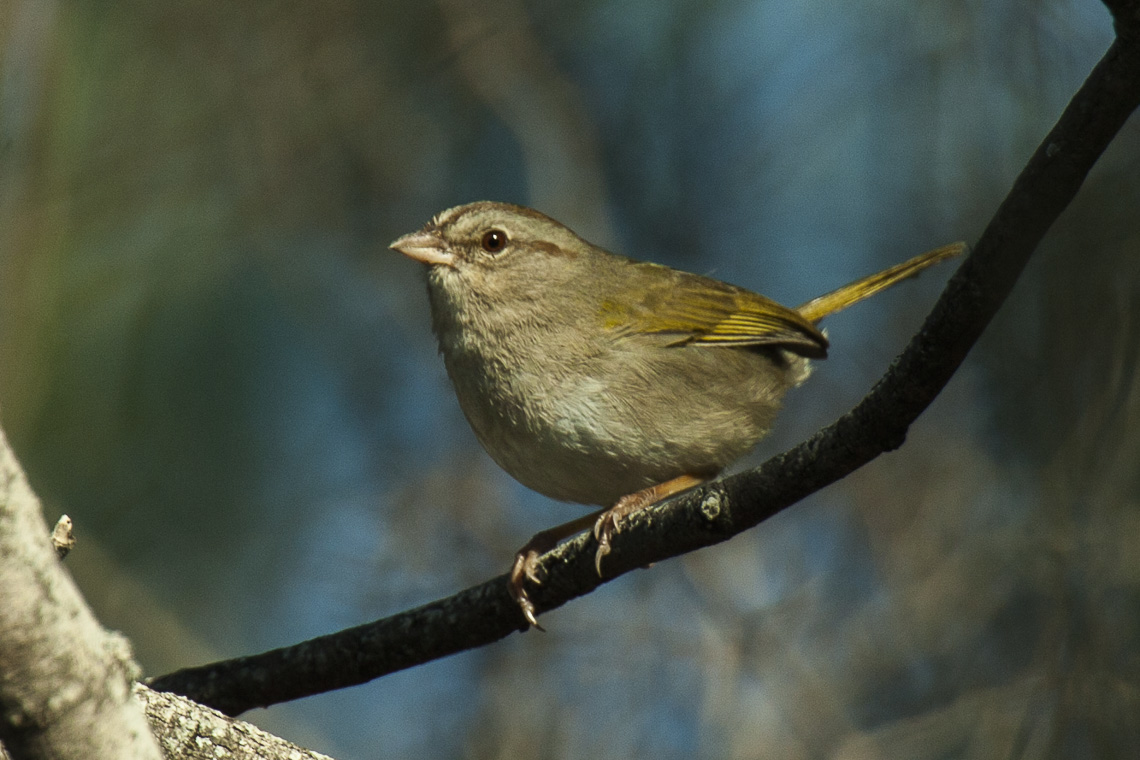
Olive sparrow

Order: Passeriformes Family: Passerellidae

Until 2017, these species were considered part of the family Emberizidae. Most of the species are known as sparrows, but these birds are not closely related to the Old World sparrows which are in the family Passeridae. Many of these have distinctive head patterns.

- Common chlorospingus, Chlorospingus flavopectus
- Stripe-headed sparrow, Peucaea ruficauda
- Botteri's sparrow, Peucaea botterii (A)
- Grasshopper sparrow, Ammodramus savannarum
- Olive sparrow, Arremonops rufivirgatus
- Black-striped sparrow, Arremonops conirostris
- Lark sparrow, Chondestes grammacus (A)
- Chipping sparrow, Spizella passerina
- Orange-billed sparrow, Arremon aurantiirostris
- Chestnut-capped brushfinch, Arremon brunneinucha
- Rufous-collared sparrow, Zonotrichia capensis
- Savannah sparrow, Passerculus sandwichensis (A)
- Lincoln's sparrow, Melospiza lincolnii (A)
- White-eared ground-sparrow, Melozone leucotis
- Rusty sparrow, Aimophila rufescens
- White-naped brushfinch, Atlapetes albinucha

== Yellow-breasted chat ==
Order: Passeriformes Family: Icteriidae

This species was historically placed in the wood-warblers (Parulidae) but nonetheless most authorities were unsure if it belonged there. It was placed in its own family in 2017.

- Yellow-breasted chat, Icteria virens

== Troupials and allies ==
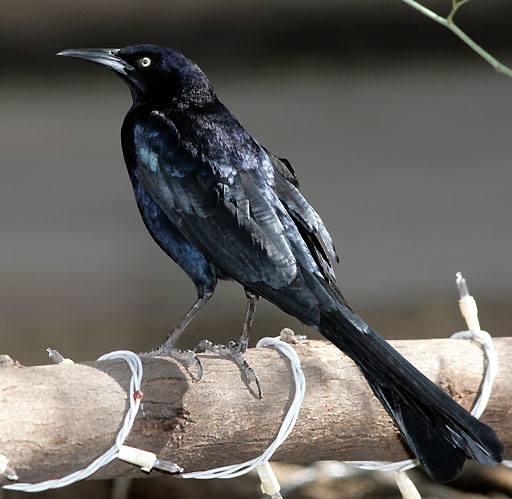
Great-tailed grackle

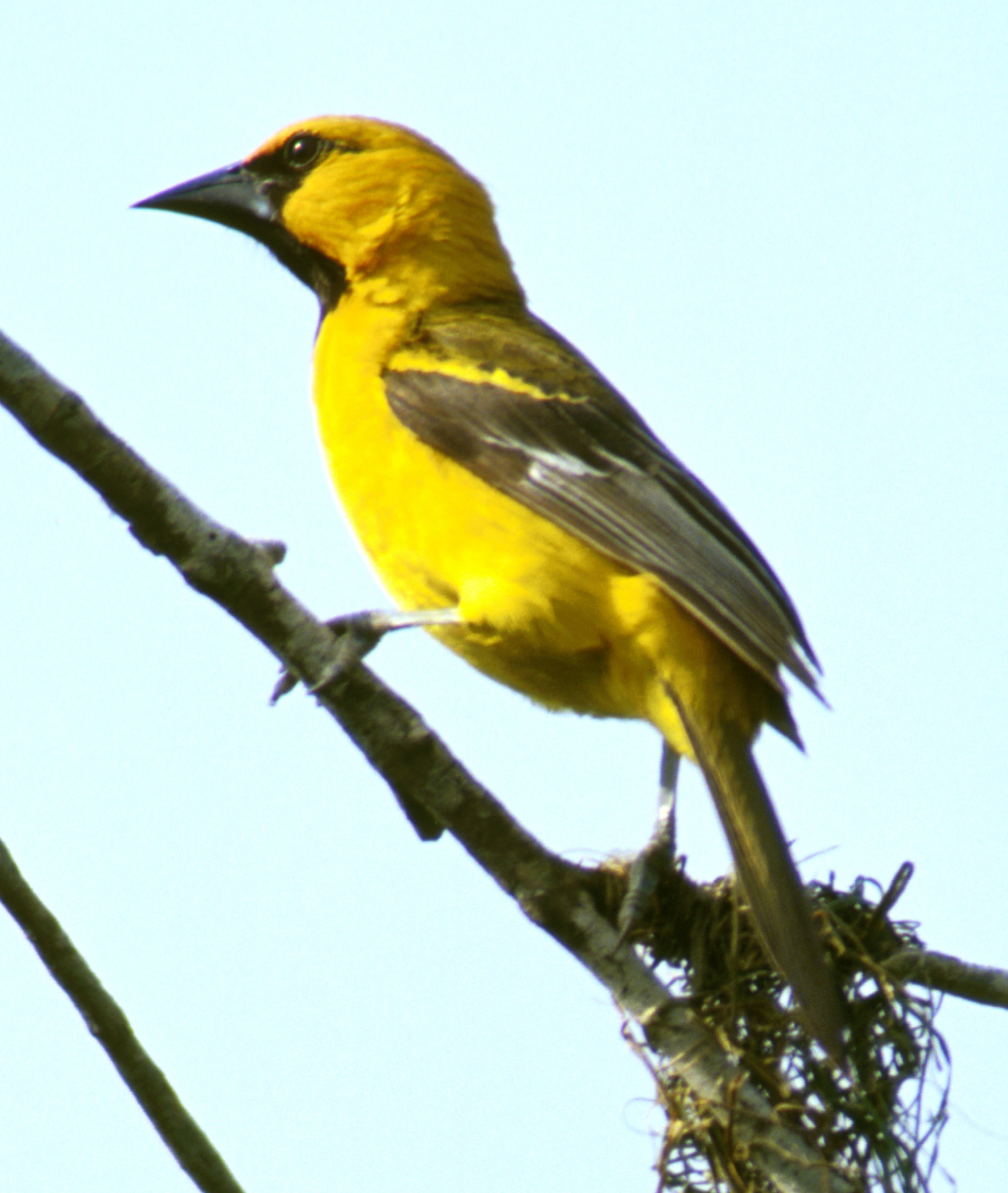
Altamira oriole

Order: Passeriformes Family: Icteridae

The icterids are a group of small to medium-sized, often colorful, passerine birds restricted to the New World and include the grackles, New World blackbirds, and New World orioles. Most species have black as the predominant plumage color, often enlivened by yellow, orange, or red.

- Yellow-headed blackbird, Xanthocephalus xanthocephalus (A)
- Bobolink, Dolichonyx oryzivorus (A)
- Eastern meadowlark, Sturnella magna (near-threatened)
- Red-breasted meadowlark, Leistes militaris (A)
- Yellow-billed cacique, Amblycercus holosericeus
- Chestnut-headed oropendola, Psarocolius wagleri
- Montezuma oropendola, Psarocolius montezuma
- Scarlet-rumped cacique, Cacicus uropygialis
- Black-vented oriole, Icterus wagleri
- Black-cowled oriole, Icterus prosthemelas
- Orchard oriole, Icterus spurius
- Yellow-backed oriole, Icterus chrysater
- Yellow-tailed oriole, Icterus mesomelas
- Streak-backed oriole, Icterus pustulatus
- Bullock's oriole, Icterus bullockii (A)
- Spot-breasted oriole, Icterus pectoralis
- Altamira oriole, Icterus gularis
- Baltimore oriole, Icterus galbula
- Red-winged blackbird, Agelaius phoeniceus
- Shiny cowbird, Molothrus bonariensis (A)
- Bronzed cowbird, Molothrus aeneus
- Giant cowbird, Molothrus oryzivorus
- Melodious blackbird, Dives dives
- Great-tailed grackle, Quiscalus mexicanus
- Nicaraguan grackle, Quiscalus nicaraguensis

== New World warblers ==
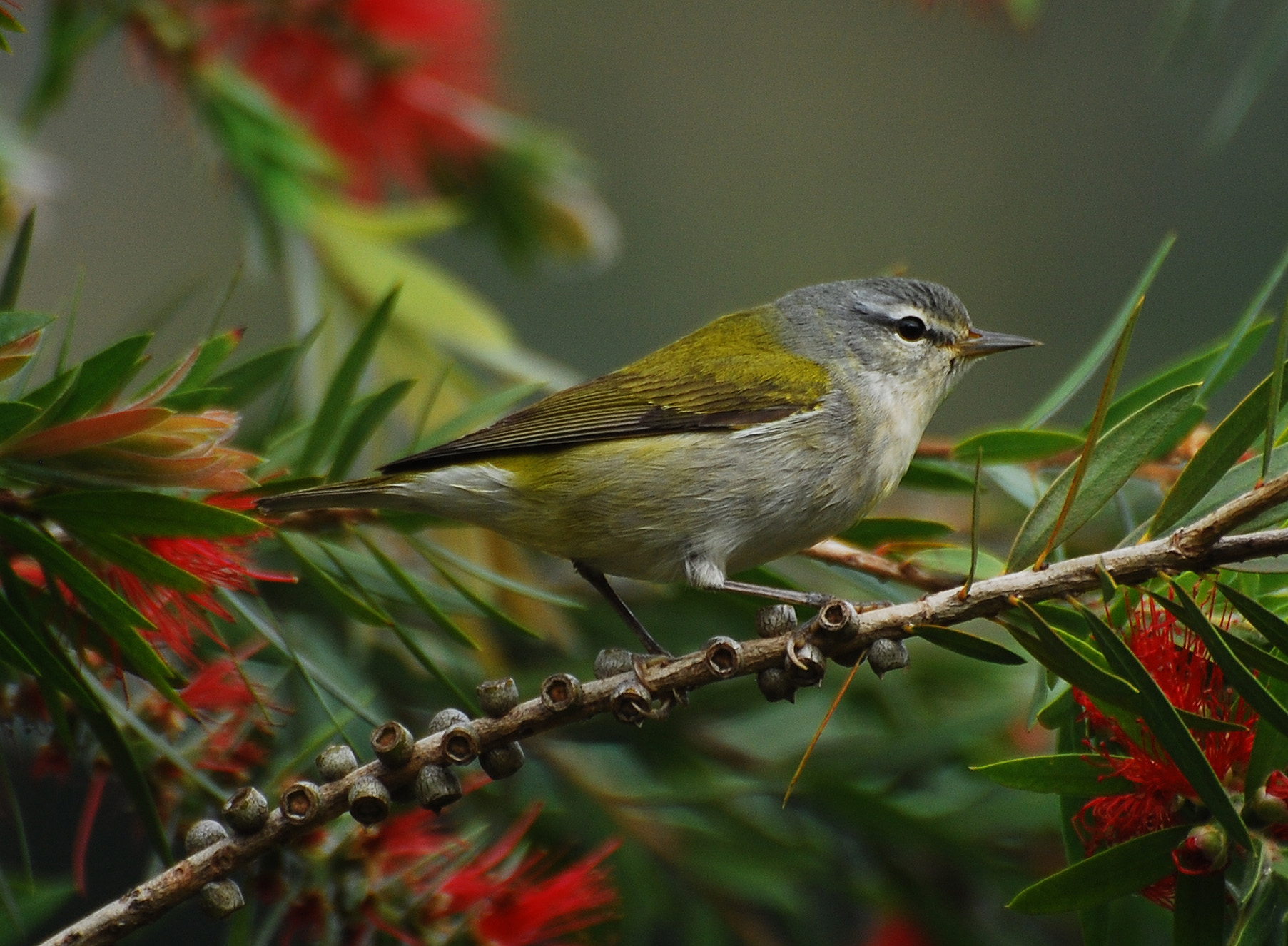
Tennessee warbler

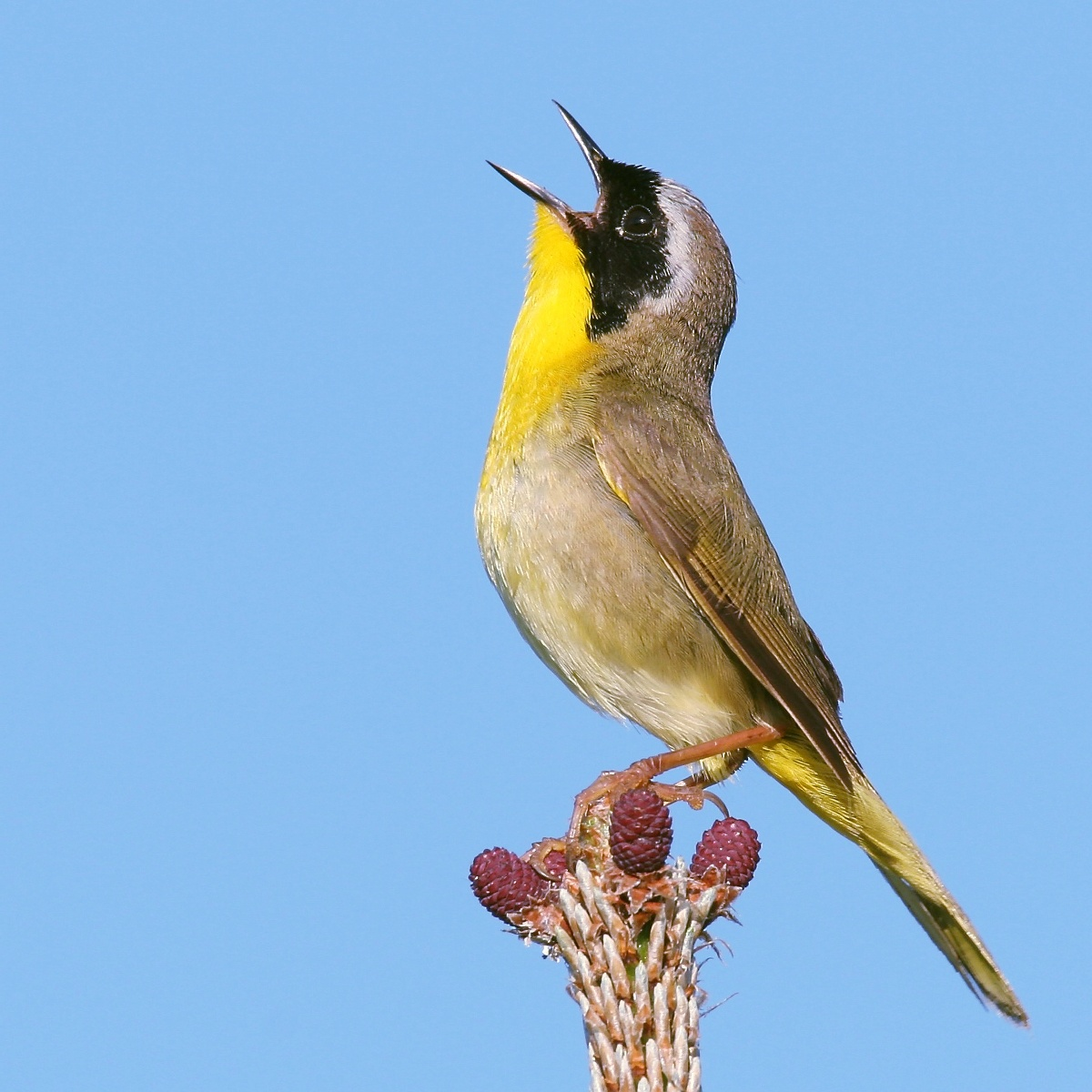
Common yellowthroat

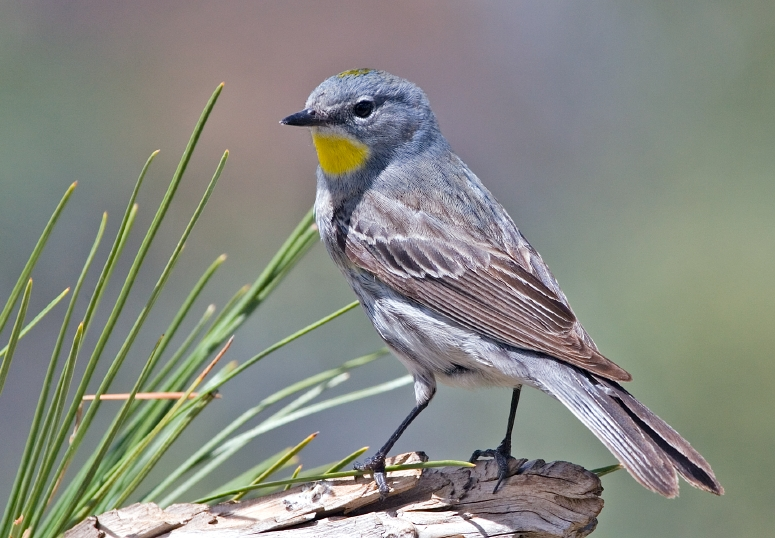
Yellow-rumped warbler

Order: Passeriformes Family: Parulidae

The wood-warblers are a group of small, often colorful, passerine birds restricted to the New World. Most are arboreal, but some are terrestrial. Most members of this family are insectivores.

- Ovenbird, Seiurus aurocapilla
- Worm-eating warbler, Helmitheros vermivorum
- Louisiana waterthrush, Parkesia motacilla
- Northern waterthrush, Parkesia noveboracensis
- Golden-winged warbler, Vermivora chrysoptera (near-threatened)
- Blue-winged warbler, Vermivora cyanoptera
- Black-and-white warbler, Mniotilta varia
- Prothonotary warbler, Protonotaria citrea
- Swainson's warbler, Limnothlypis swainsonii (A)
- Crescent-chested warbler, Leiothlypis superciliosa
- Tennessee warbler, Leiothlypis peregrina
- Orange-crowned warbler, Leiothlypis celata (A)
- Nashville warbler, Leiothlypis ruficapilla (A)
- Connecticut warbler, Oporornis agilis (A)
- Gray-crowned yellowthroat, Geothlypis poliocephala
- MacGillivray's warbler, Geothlypis tolmiei
- Mourning warbler, Geothlypis philadelphia
- Kentucky warbler, Geothlypis formosa
- Olive-crowned yellowthroat, Geothlypis semiflava
- Common yellowthroat, Geothlypis trichas
- Hooded warbler, Setophaga citrina
- American redstart, Setophaga ruticilla
- Cape May warbler, Setophaga tigrina
- Cerulean warbler, Setophaga cerulea (near-threatened)
- Northern parula, Setophaga americana
- Tropical parula, Setophaga pitiayumi
- Magnolia warbler, Setophaga magnolia
- Bay-breasted warbler, Setophaga castanea
- Blackburnian warbler, Setophaga fusca
- Yellow warbler, Setophaga petechia
- Chestnut-sided warbler, Setophaga pensylvanica
- Blackpoll warbler, Setophaga striata (A) (near-threatened)
- Black-throated blue warbler, Setophaga caerulescens (A)
- Palm warbler, Setophaga palmarum
- Yellow-rumped warbler, Setophaga coronata
- Yellow-throated warbler, Setophaga dominica
- Prairie warbler, Setophaga discolor (A)
- Grace's warbler, Setophaga graciae
- Townsend's warbler, Setophaga townsendi
- Hermit warbler, Setophaga occidentalis
- Golden-cheeked warbler, Setophaga chrysoparia (endangered)
- Black-throated green warbler, Setophaga virens
- Buff-rumped warbler, Myiothlypis fulvicauda
- Fan-tailed warbler, Basileuterus lachrymosus
- Rufous-capped warbler, Basileuterus rufifrons
- Chestnut-capped warbler, Basileuterus delattrii
- Golden-crowned warbler, Basileuterus culicivorus
- Canada warbler, Cardellina canadensis
- Wilson's warbler, Cardellina pusilla
- Painted redstart, Myioborus pictus
- Slate-throated redstart, Myioborus miniatus

== Mitrospingid tanagers ==
Order: Passeriformes Family: Mitrospingidae

The members of this small family were previously included in Thraupidae ("true" tanagers). They were placed in this new family in 2017.

- Dusky-faced tanager, Mitrospingus cassinii (A)

== Cardinals and allies ==
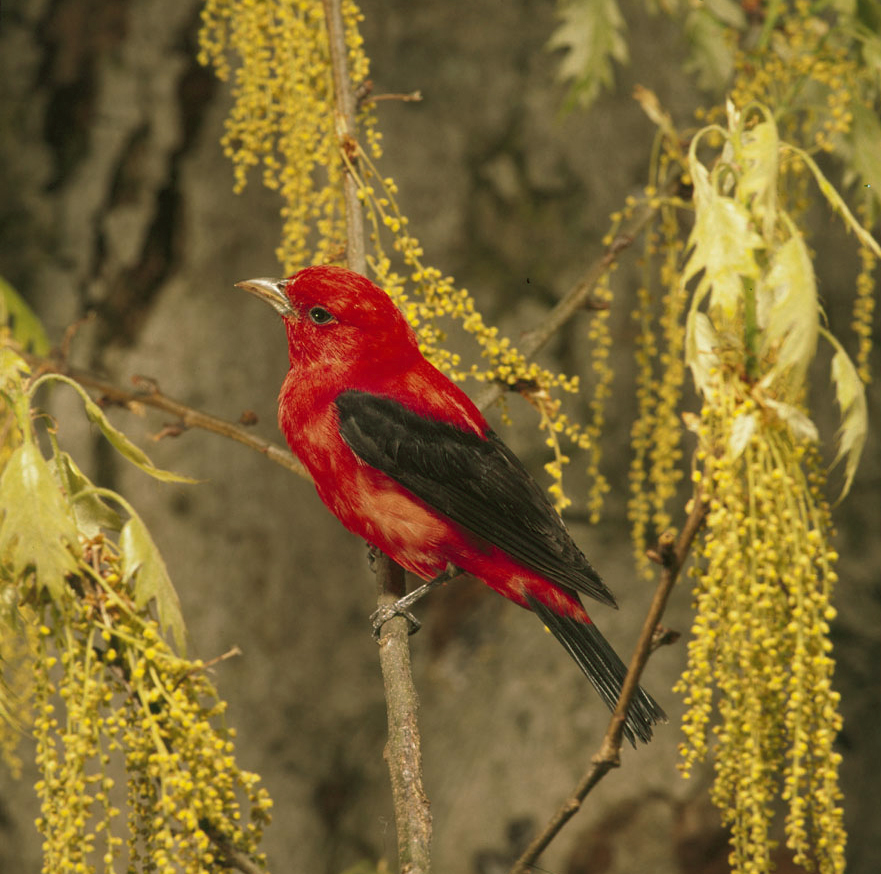
Scarlet tanager

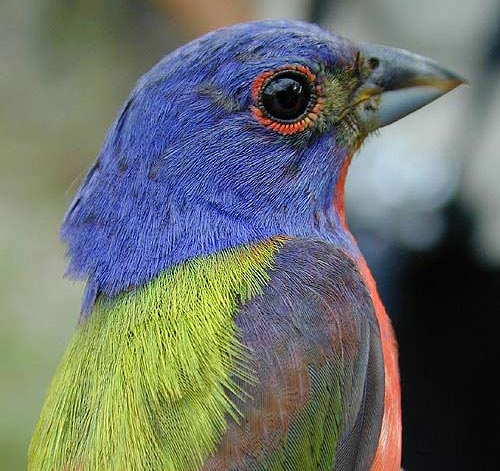
Painted bunting

Order: Passeriformes Family: Cardinalidae

The cardinals are a family of robust, seed-eating birds with strong bills. They are typically associated with open woodland. The sexes usually have distinct plumages.

- Hepatic tanager, Piranga flava
- Summer tanager, Piranga rubra
- Scarlet tanager, Piranga olivacea
- Western tanager, Piranga ludoviciana
- Flame-colored tanager, Piranga bidentata
- White-winged tanager, Piranga leucoptera
- Red-crowned ant-tanager, Habia rubica
- Red-throated ant-tanager, Habia fuscicauda
- Carmiol's tanager, Chlorothraupis carmioli
- Black-faced grosbeak, Caryothraustes poliogaster
- Rose-breasted grosbeak, Pheucticus ludovicianus
- Blue seedeater, Amaurospiza concolor (A)
- Blue-black grosbeak, Cyanoloxia cyanoides
- Blue bunting, Cyanocompsa parellina
- Blue grosbeak, Passerina caerulea
- Indigo bunting, Passerina cyanea
- Painted bunting, Passerina ciris (near-threatened)
- Dickcissel, Spiza americana

== Tanagers and allies ==
Order: Passeriformes Family: Thraupidae

The tanagers are a large group of small to medium-sized passerine birds restricted to the New World, mainly in the tropics. Many species are brightly colored. As a family they are omnivorous, but individual species specialize in eating fruits, seeds, insects, or other types of food. Most have short, rounded wings.

- Golden-hooded tanager, Stilpnia larvata
- Blue-gray tanager, Thraupis episcopus
- Yellow-winged tanager, Thraupis abbas
- Palm tanager, Thraupis palmarum
- Plain-colored tanager, Tangara inornata (A)
- Rufous-winged tanager, Tangara lavinia
- Bay-headed tanager, Tangara gyrola
- Grassland yellow-finch, Sicalis luteola
- Slaty finch, Haplospiza rustica (A)
- Cinnamon-bellied flowerpiercer, Diglossa baritula
- Green honeycreeper, Chlorophanes spiza
- Blue-black grassquit, Volatinia jacarina
- Gray-headed tanager, Eucometis penicillata
- White-shouldered tanager, Loriotus luctuosus
- Tawny-crested tanager, Tachyphonus delatrii
- White-lined tanager, Tachyphonus rufus (A)
- White-throated shrike-tanager, Lanio leucothorax
- Crimson-collared tanager, Ramphocelus sanguinolentus
- Scarlet-rumped tanager, Ramphocelus passerinii
- Shining honeycreeper, Cyanerpes lucidus
- Red-legged honeycreeper, Cyanerpes cyaneus
- Scarlet-thighed dacnis, Dacnis venusta (A)
- Blue dacnis, Dacnis cayana
- Bananaquit, Coereba flaveola
- Yellow-faced grassquit, Tiaris olivaceus
- Thick-billed seed-finch, Sporophila funerea
- Nicaraguan seed-finch, Sporophila nuttingi
- Variable seedeater, Sporophila corvina
- Slate-colored seedeater, Sporophila schistacea (A)
- Morelet's seedeater, Sporophila morelleti
- Yellow-bellied seedeater, Sporophila nigricollis (A)
- Ruddy-breasted seedeater, Sporophila minuta
- Black-headed saltator, Saltator atriceps
- Buff-throated saltator, Saltator maximus
- Slate-colored grosbeak, Saltator grossus
- Cinnamon-bellied saltator, Saltator grandis
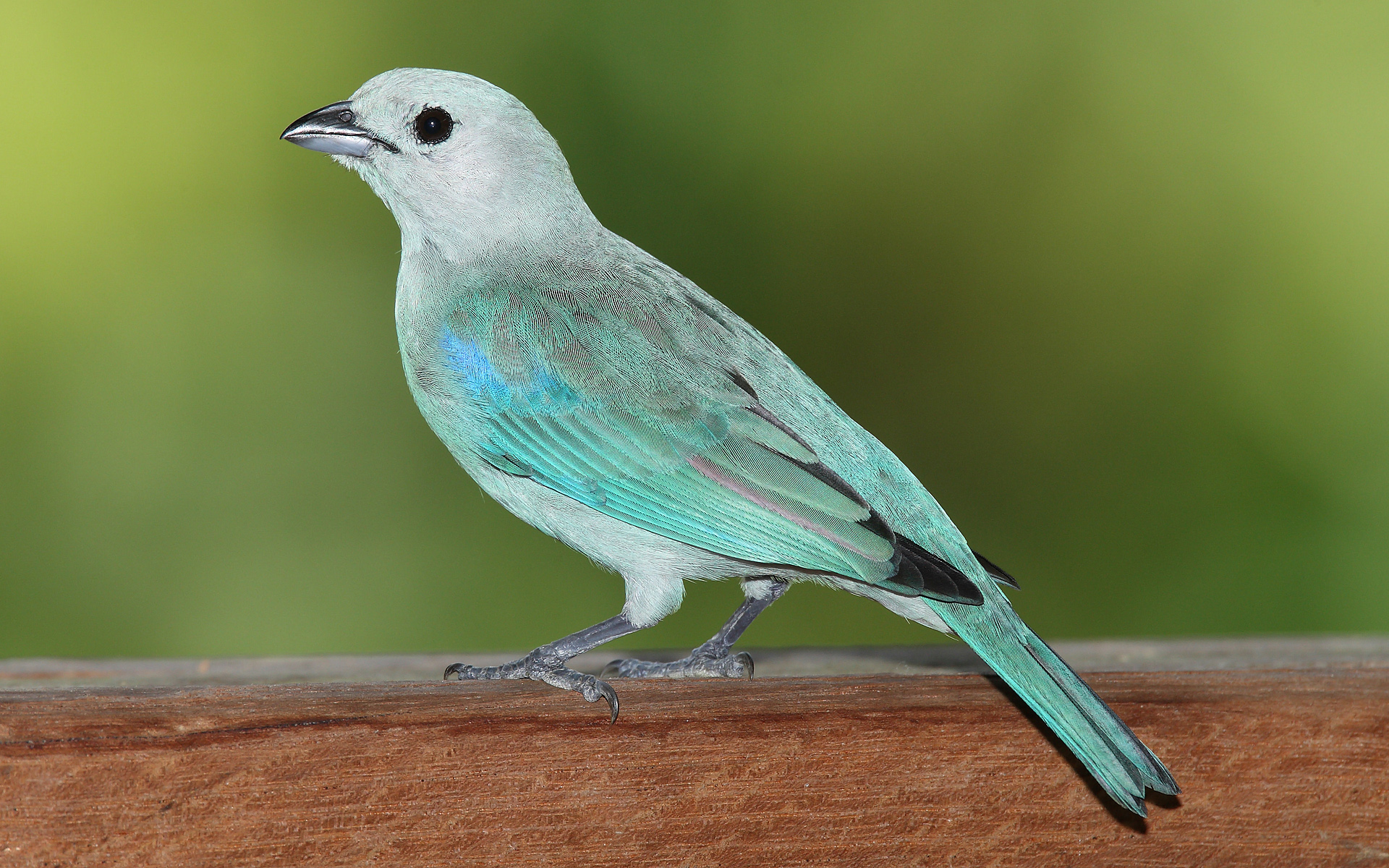
Blue-gray tanager

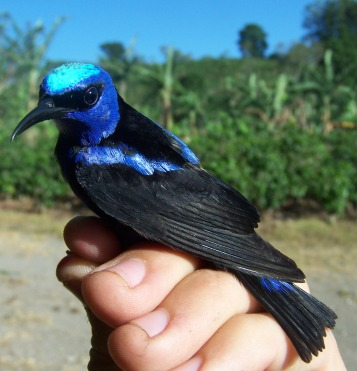
Red-legged honeycreeper

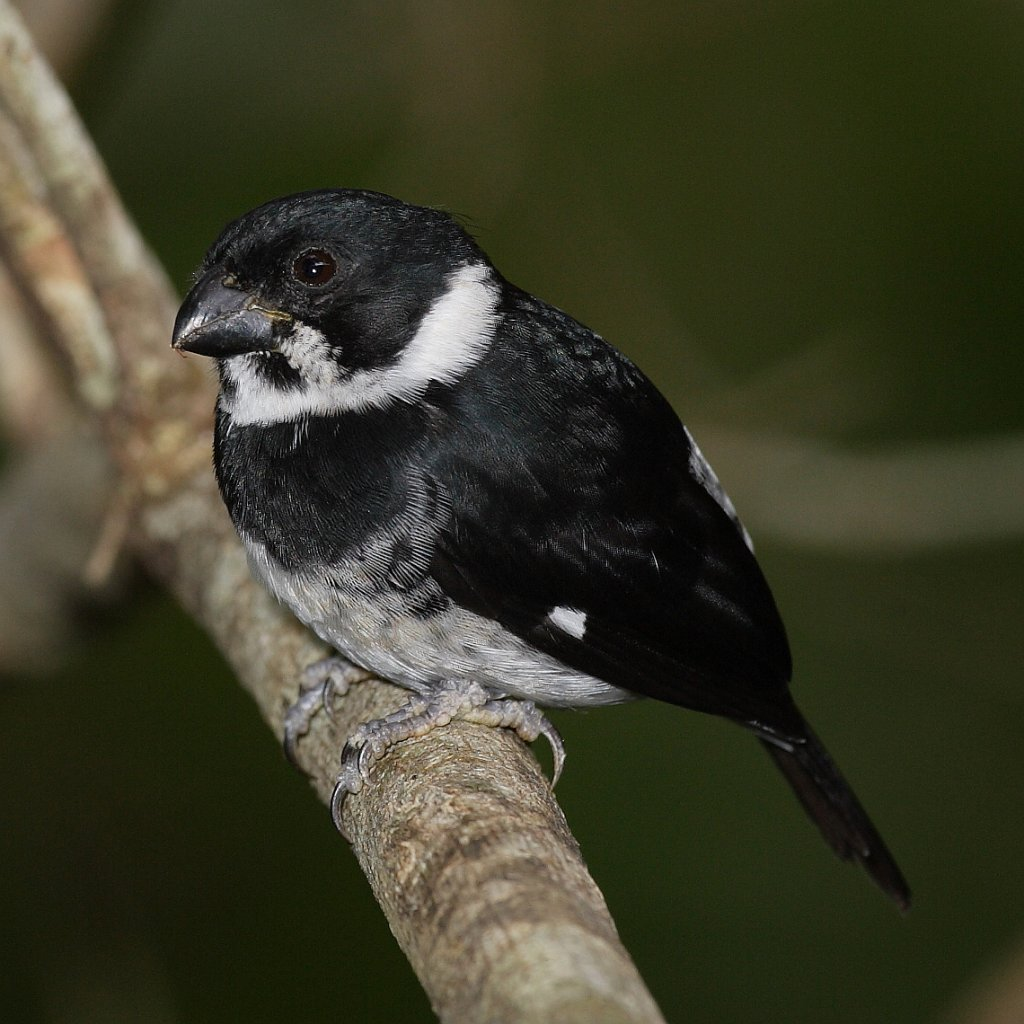
Variable seedeater

== See also ==
- Wildlife of Nicaragua
- List of birds
- Lists of birds by region
