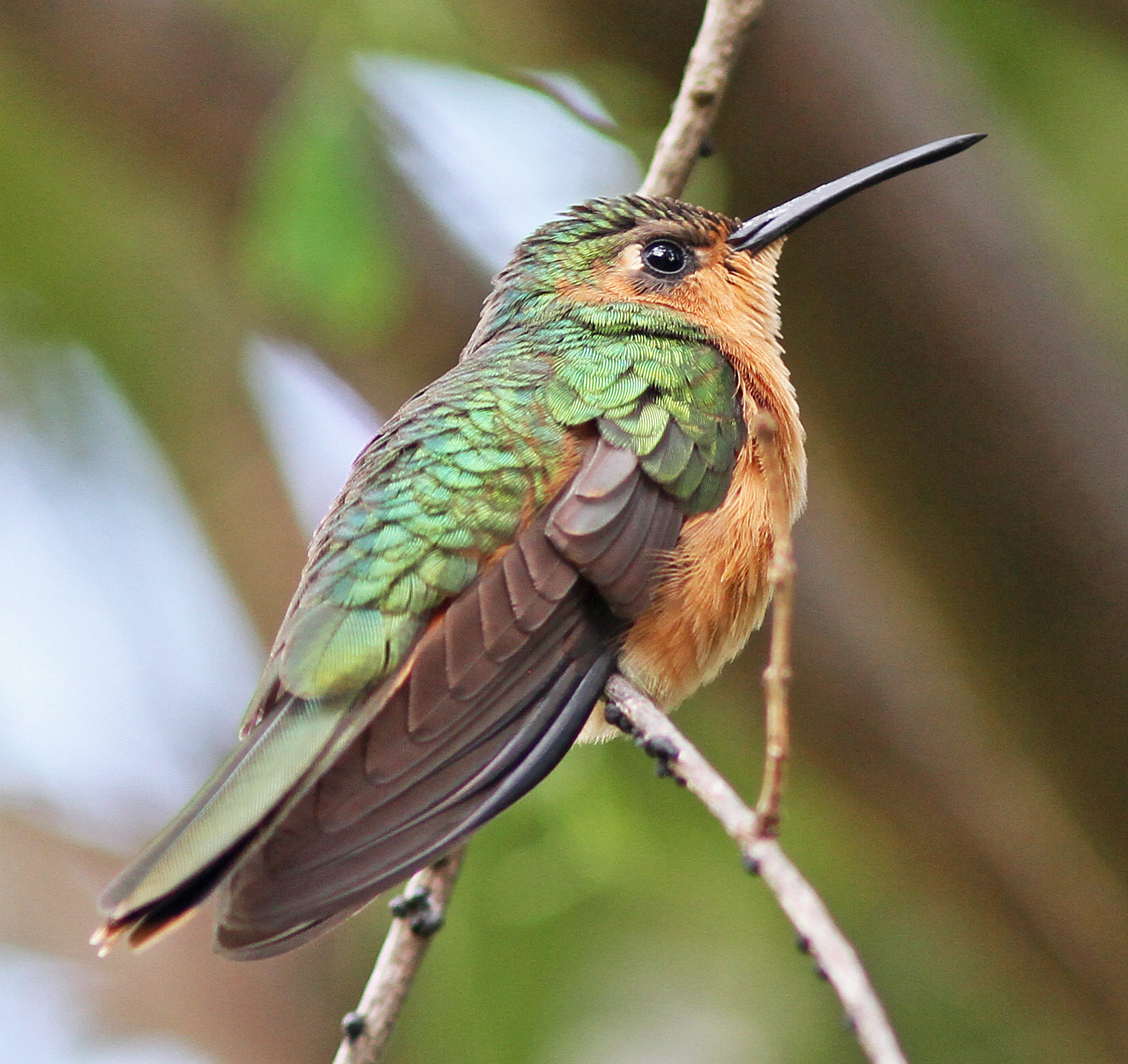
- Rufous sabrewing (Pampa rufa)

Scientific classification
- Kingdom: Animalia
- Phylum: Chordata
- Class: Aves
- Order: Apodiformes
- Family: Trochilidae
- Tribe: Trochilini
- Genus: Pampa; Reichenbach, 1854

Species
- see text

= Pampa (bird) =

Genus of birds

Pampa is a genus of birds in the hummingbird family Trochilidae. These species are resident in northern Middle America.

== Taxonomy ==
The genus Pampa was introduced in 1854 by the German naturalist Ludwig Reichenbach to accommodate a single species, Pampa campyloptera Reichenbach, 1854, which is the type species of the genus by monotypy. Reichenbach's binomial name was a replacement for Ornismya pampa Lesson, 1832, now a subspecies of the wedge-tailed sabrewing. Also in 1854 the entomologist Francis Walker introduced the name Pampa for a genus of Lepidoptera in his List of the specimens of lepidopterous insects in the collection of the British Museum which, according to Charles Davies Sherborn, was published on 11 February 1854. If Reichenbach's genus Pampa was published after this date, then under the rules of the International Commission on Zoological Nomenclature (ICZN), the name Pampa Reichenbach, 1854, is a junior homonym and becomes invalid. Another genus Platystylopterus was introduced by Reichenbach in 1854 on the same page as his genus Pampa. The type species was fixed in 1855 by George Gray as Campylopterus rufus Lesson, 1840, the rufous sabrewing.

== Species ==
The genus contains two species.

Genus Pampa – Reichenbach, 1854 – two species
Common name	Scientific name and subspecies	Range	Size and ecology	IUCN status and estimated population
Rufous sabrewing	Pampa rufa (Lesson, 1840)	El Salvador, Guatemala, and Mexico	Size: Habitat: Diet:	LC
Wedge-tailed sabrewing	Pampa curvipennis (Deppe, 1830) Three subspecies: P. c. curvipennis (Deppe, W, 1830); P. c. pampa (Lesson, RP, 1832); P. c. excellens Wetmore, A, 1941	Belize, Guatemala, Mexico, and possibly Honduras.	Size: Habitat: Diet:	LC

These two species were formerly placed in the genus Campylopterus. A molecular phylogenetic study published in 2014 found that the genus Campylopterus was polyphyletic. In the revised classification to create monophyletic genera, these species were moved to the resurrected genus Pampa that had been introduced in 1854 by Ludwig Reichenbach.
