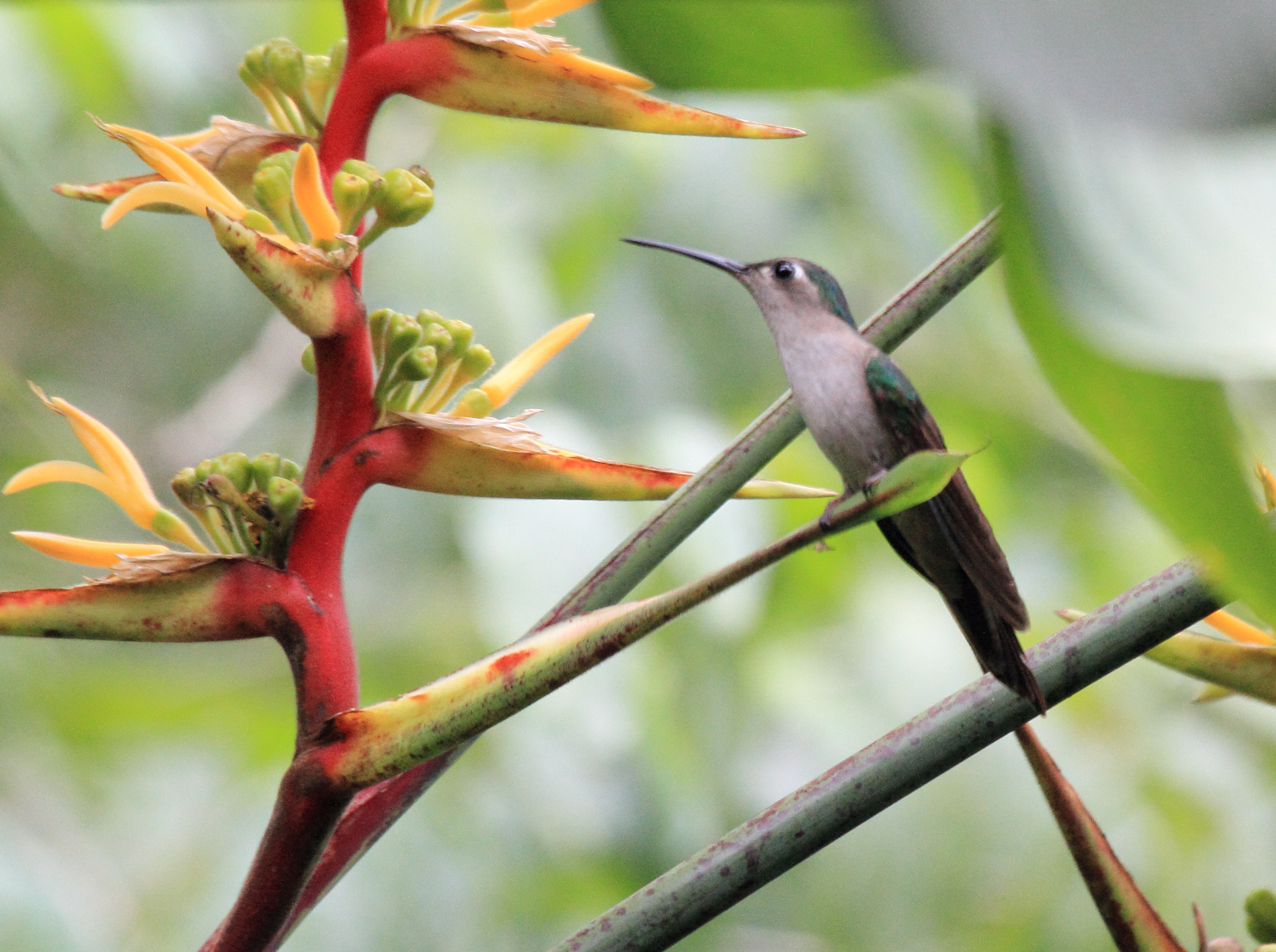
- In Belize

Conservation status
- Least Concern (IUCN 3.1)
- CITES Appendix II

Scientific classification
- Kingdom: Animalia
- Phylum: Chordata
- Class: Aves
- Clade: Strisores
- Order: Apodiformes
- Family: Trochilidae
- Genus: Pampa
- Species: P. curvipennis

Binomial name
- Pampa curvipennis (Deppe, 1830)
- Distribution

= Wedge-tailed sabrewing =

Species of hummingbird

The wedge-tailed sabrewing (Pampa curvipennis) is a species of hummingbird in the "emeralds", tribe Trochilini of subfamily Trochilinae. It is found in Belize, Guatemala, Mexico, and possibly Honduras. Two subspecies have sometimes been treated as separate species, the curve-winged sabrewing and the long-tailed sabrewing.

== Taxonomy ==
The wedge-tailed sabrewing was formally described in 1830 under the binomial name Trochilus curvipennis by the German accountant Wilhelm Deppe in a price list of specimens that had been collected in Mexico by Wilhelm's brother Ferdinand Deppe. The specific epithet combines the Latin curvus meaning "curved" with -pennis meaning "-winged". The wedge-tailed sabrewing is now placed with the rufous sabrewing in the genus Pampa that was introduced in 1854 by German naturalist Ludwig Reichenbach.

This species was formerly placed in the genus Campylopterus. A molecular phylogenetic study published in 2014 found that the genus Campylopterus was polyphyletic. In the revised classification to create monophyletic genera, the wedge-tailed sabrewing was moved to the resurrected genus Pampa.

Three subspecies are recognised:

- P. c. curvipennis (Deppe, W, 1830) – southwestern Tamaulipas and southeastern San Luis Potosí to northern Oaxaca (northeastern to southern Mexico)
- P. c. pampa (Lesson, RP, 1832) – Yucatán Peninsula to northern Guatemala, Belize, and northern Honduras
- P. c. excellens Wetmore, A, 1941 – Sierra de los Tuxtlas (southeastern Mexico)

The subspecies P. c. curvipennis has sometimes been treated as a separate species, the curve-winged sabrewing. The subspecies P. c. excellens has also been treated as a separate species, the long-tailed sabrewing. The taxa are now treated as subspecies based on the modest differences in DNA sequence, the similar vocalization and the relatively limited differences in response to playback.

== Description ==
The wedge-tailed sabrewing is 11.5 to 13.5 cm (4.5 to 5.3 in) long. Males weigh an average of about 6.6 g (0.23 oz) and females 5.0 g (0.18 oz). Their bill is straight, longish, and stout. Adult males have a bright violet crown, metallic green to bronze green upperparts, and bluish green uppertail coverts. Their tail feathers are mostly dull metallic bluish green that becomes purplish black at the ends. The outermost pair have dusky to brownish gray outer webs. Much of their face is dull grayish white to gray, with a white spot behind the eye. Their underparts are brownish gray. Adult females are very similar to the male. However, their crown is dull blue rather than bright violet, their underparts have a pale cinnamon wash, and the tips of the outermost tail feathers have a buff wash. Immature birds are similar to the adult female, with a duller crown whose feathers have buff tips.

== Distribution and habitat ==
The wedge-tailed sabrewing is found in Mexico's Yucatán Peninsula and northeastern Chiapas, Belize, and northern Guatemala. Most sources also include a disjunct population in Honduras in its range. (Note that the map includes the curve-winged sabrewing's separate and more westerly range and excludes Honduras.) It inhabits the interior and edges of humid evergreen and semi-deciduous forest and rainforest. In elevation it ranges from sea level to 1,400 m (4,600 ft). The wedge-tailed sabrewing is generally a year-round resident but individuals may move to lower elevations after breeding.

== Behavior ==
=== Feeding ===
The wedge-tailed sabrewing's foraging strategy and diet are not known in detail; most of the available information applies to the broader two- or three-subspecies models without separation. It consumes nectar, as do all hummingbirds, and insects like most of them. It forages in the low to middle strata of the forest.

=== Breeding ===
As is the case for feeding, most of the wedge-tailed sabrewing's breeding phenology has not been detailed separately from that of the curve-winged and long-tailed. It is believed to nest between March and July. Males display for females at leks.

=== Vocalization ===
The available descriptions of the wedge-tailed sabrewing's vocalizations apply to the two- or three-subspecies models. (The xeno-canto recordings are from the monotypic species.) Males sing by themselves or in small groups from bare twigs in the forest understory. The song is "a loud, prolonged, gurgling warble interspersed with squeaky chipping". It is the most complex of any hummingbirds' and is "even comparable with calls of the songbirds." Other vocalizations include "a steady sharp chipping, chip chip chip chip-ip' chip ...and a nasal peek".

== Conservation status ==
The wedge-tailed sabrewing is considered by the International Union for Conservation of Nature (IUCN) as being of Least Concern.
