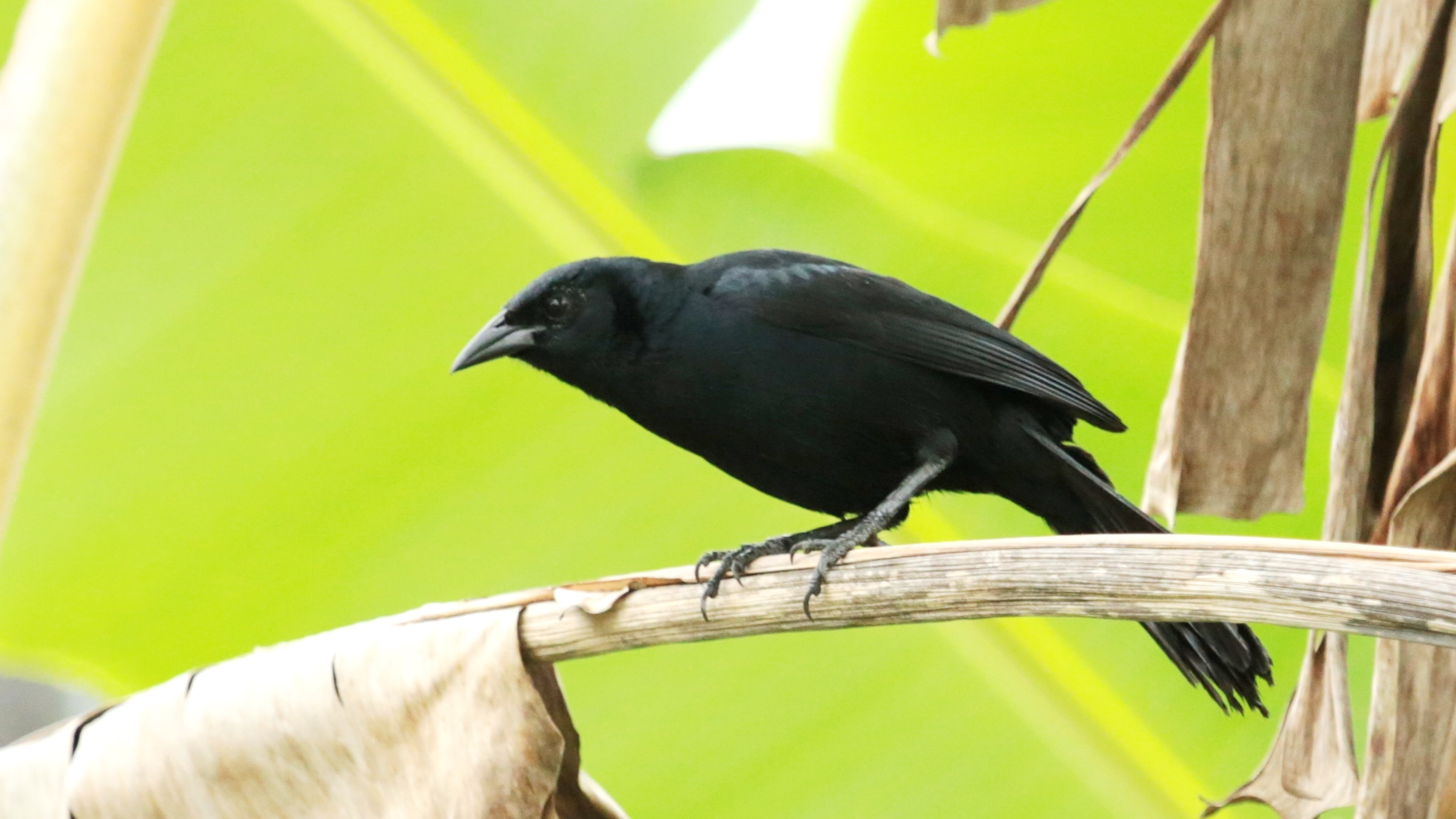

Scientific classification
- Kingdom: Animalia
- Phylum: Chordata
- Class: Aves
- Order: Passeriformes
- Family: Icteridae
- Genus: Dives; Cassin, 1867

Type species
- Lampropsar dives Bonaparte, 1850

Species
- Dives dives Dives warczewiczi

= Dives (bird) =

Genus of birds

Dives is a genus of two Neotropical birds in the family Icteridae.

== Description ==
The two species look similar, with plumage ranging from brownish black in juveniles to black with iridescence (green, blue, or violet) in adults, slightly more iridescent in males. The bare parts are black and the eyes are dark brown. The upper edge of the bill (the culmen) is curved, not flattened as in many other icterids, and the bill has a slight hook at the tip. The songs are varied and pleasant.

== Taxonomy ==
The Cuban blackbird was previously considered a species, but is now considered in its own genus Ptiloxena.

If the ranges of the melodious blackbird and the northern populations of the scrub blackbird overlapped, they would be indistinguishable in the field apart from voice, and some authorities lump these two species into one; on the other hand some split the scrub blackbird into two species.

This genus is believed to be most closely related to Euphagus and Quiscalus.

=== Species ===
It contains two species:

Genus Dives – Cassin, 1867 – two species
| Common name | Scientific name and subspecies | Range | Size and ecology | IUCN status and estimated population |
|---|---|---|---|---|
| Melodious blackbird | Dives dives (Deppe, 1830) | coastal eastern and south-eastern Mexico to Costa Rica | Size: Habitat: Diet: | LC |
| Scrub blackbird | Dives warczewiczi (Cabanis, 1861) | Ecuador and Peru | Size: Habitat: Diet: | LC |

== Habitat ==
Both species live in open habitats, including agricultural land, and have adapted well to human disturbance.
