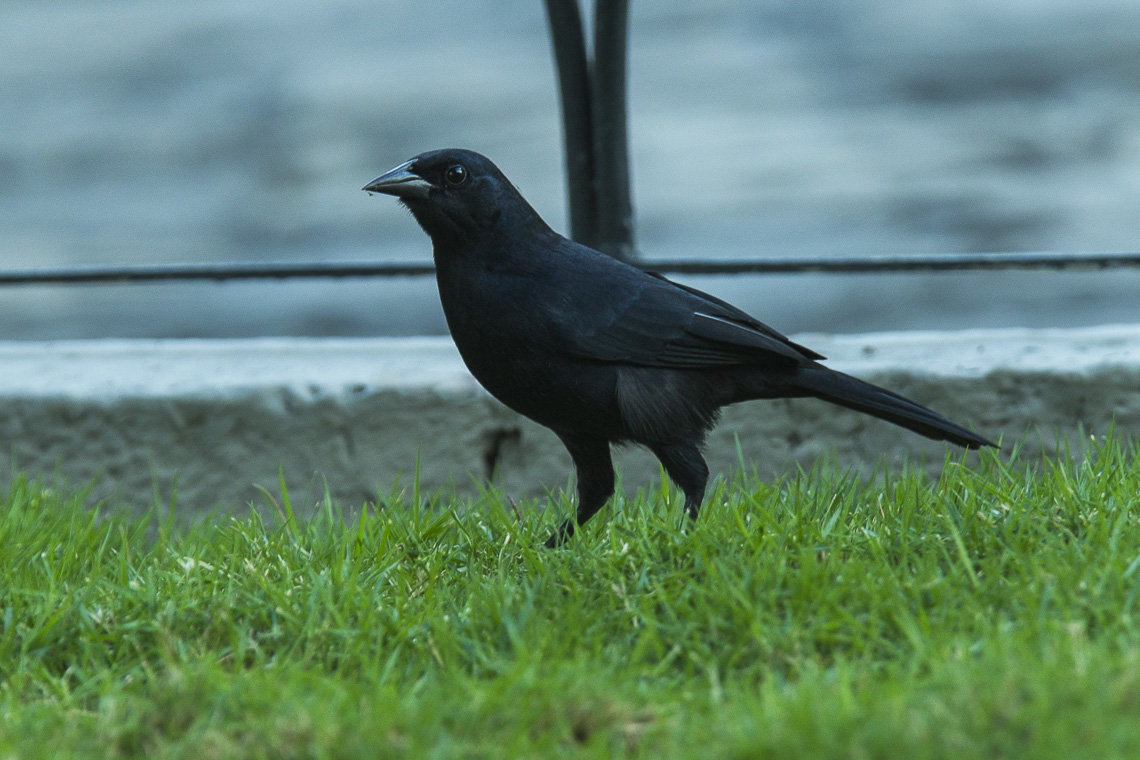

Conservation status
- Least Concern (IUCN 3.1)

Scientific classification
- Kingdom: Animalia
- Phylum: Chordata
- Class: Aves
- Order: Passeriformes
- Family: Icteridae
- Genus: Dives
- Species: D. warczewiczi

Binomial name
- Dives warczewiczi (Cabanis, 1861)

Synonyms
- See text

= Scrub blackbird =

Species of bird

The scrub blackbird (Dives warczewiczi) is a species of bird in the family Icteridae, the oropendolas, New World orioles, and New World blackbirds. It is found in Colombia, Ecuador, and Peru.

== Taxonomy and systematics ==
The scrub blackbird was formally described by Jean Cabanis in 1861 with the binomial Lamprosar Warczewiczi [sic]. The specific epithet honors Josef Ritter von Rawiez Warszewicz and until well into the twentieth century it was spelled by many taxonomic systems the same way as the honoree's name, "WarSzewiczi" (emphasis added). However, because Cabanis misspelled it as "WarCzewiczi" (emphasis added), by the principle of priority that spelling has been restored. The species now shares the genus Dives with the melodious blackbird (D. dives). The two form a superspecies and some early twentieth century authors treated them as conspecific.

The scrub blackbird has two subspecies, the nominate D. w. warczewiczi (Cabanis, 1861) and D. w. kalinowskii (Berlepsch & Stolzmann, 1892).

== Description ==
Scrub blackbirds of the nominate subspecies are about 22 cm (9 in) long and those of subspecies D. w. kalinowskii 27 to 31 cm (11 to 12 in). Males of the nominate subspecies weigh an average of 85.5 g (3.0 oz) and females 84 g (3.0 oz). Males of subspecies D. w. kalinowskii weigh an average of 110 g (3.9 oz). The species has a long tail and disproportionately large legs and feet. Both sexes of both subspecies have the same entirely black plumage. The nominate subspecies has a blue to green iridescence and D. w. kalinowskii has a violaceous iridescence. Both subspecies have a dark brown iris, a black bill, and black legs and feet. Juveniles are a duller, slightly glossy, blackish brown.

== Distribution and habitat ==
The nominate subspecies of the scrub blackbird is found from far southwestern Colombia's Nariño Department and Gorgona Island off its shore south through western Ecuador into northwestern Peru as far as La Libertad Department. Subspecies D. w. kalinowskii is found in western Peru from La Libertad south to Ica Department also further inland in intermontane river valleys of Cajamarca and Huancavelica departments.

The scrub blackbird inhabits a variety of semi-open to open landscapes including woodlands, scrublands, cultivated areas, orchards, parks, gardens, and suburban and urban areas. In generally arid southern Ecuador and northern Peru it avoids the most arid areas and is found in gallery forest, oases, and irrigated fields. In elevation it is found below 1,300 m (4,300 ft) in Colombia. In Ecuador it is mostly below 1,000 m (3,300 ft) but reaches at least 2,100 m (6,900 ft) in far southern Loja Province. In Peru it is mostly below 2,400 m (7,900 ft) but locally reaches 3,600 m (11,800 ft).

== Behavior ==
=== Movement ===
The scrub blackbird is a year-round resident.

=== Feeding ===
The scrub blackbird's diet has not been studied but is believed to be insects, other arthropods, fruits (wild and domestic), seeds, and small vertebrates. It forages mostly on the ground though sometimes in trees, and is usually found in pairs or small groups.

=== Breeding ===
The scrub blackbird breeds between February and May. It is thought to be monogamous and less territorial than its relative the melodious blackbird. Its nest is a cup made from sticks, plant fibers, and mud placed in a tree. The clutch is two to three eggs that are pale blue with brownish to black spots. The incubation period is not known; fledging occurs about 12 days after hatch. Details of parental care are not known. Nests are parasitized by the shiny cowbird (Molothrus bonariensis).

=== Vocalization ===
The scrub blackbird is "a scandalously noisy bird". Pairs typically sing in duet, "a rather pleasant mixture of warbles, trills and whistles, mixed with chattering and buzzing notes". Birds typically sing from a perch while fluffing their feathers, "bowing", and pointing their bill to the sky. One rendering of the song is "a variation of wr-tzzzeeét! worgleeo, wor-gleeo-glezeé". Another is "an explosive series of loud liquid notes...for example: hooEE triZEER chee-t't't't't". Its calls are described as "a siskin-like clee or seeeuw" and "a rising ree? [and] a piercing, descending teee".

== Status ==
The IUCN has assessed the scrub blackbird as being of Least Concern. It has a large range; its population size is not known but is believed to be increasing. No immediate threats have been identified. As of 2010 it was a "recent colonist" in Colombia. It is "hard to miss" in its Ecuadorean range. It is fairly common in western Peru and local in the interior valleys. It "[a]ppears to be expanding its range in both Peru and Ecuador".
