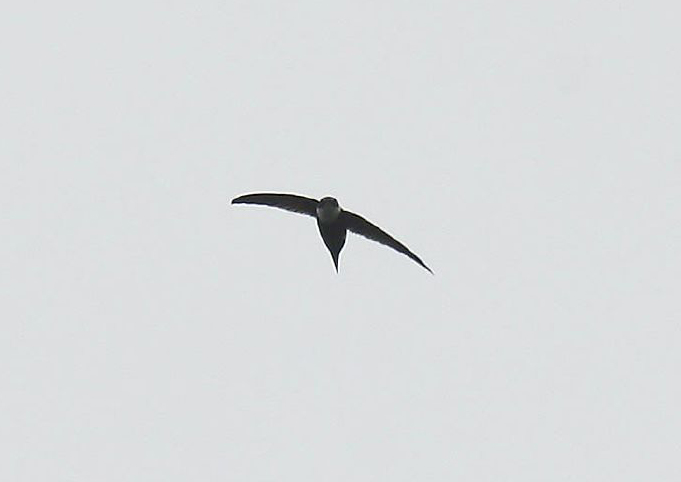
- Lesser swallow-tailed swift (Panyptila cayennensis)

Scientific classification
- Kingdom: Animalia
- Phylum: Chordata
- Class: Aves
- Order: Apodiformes
- Family: Apodidae
- Tribe: Apodini
- Genus: Panyptila; Cabanis, 1847

Type species
- Hirundo cayennensis (lesser swallow-tailed swift) Gmelin, JF, 1789

= Panyptila =

Genus of birds

Panyptila is a genus of swifts in the family Apodidae. The two species are found in Central and South America.

== Taxonomy ==
The genus Panyptila was introduced in 1847 by the German ornithologist Jean Cabanis with the lesser swallow-tailed swift as the type species. The genus name combines the Ancient Greek panu meaning "very" or "exceedingly" with ptilon meaning "wing".

The genus contains two species:

- Great swallow-tailed swift (Panyptila sanctihieronymi)
- Lesser swallow-tailed swift (Panyptila cayennensis)
