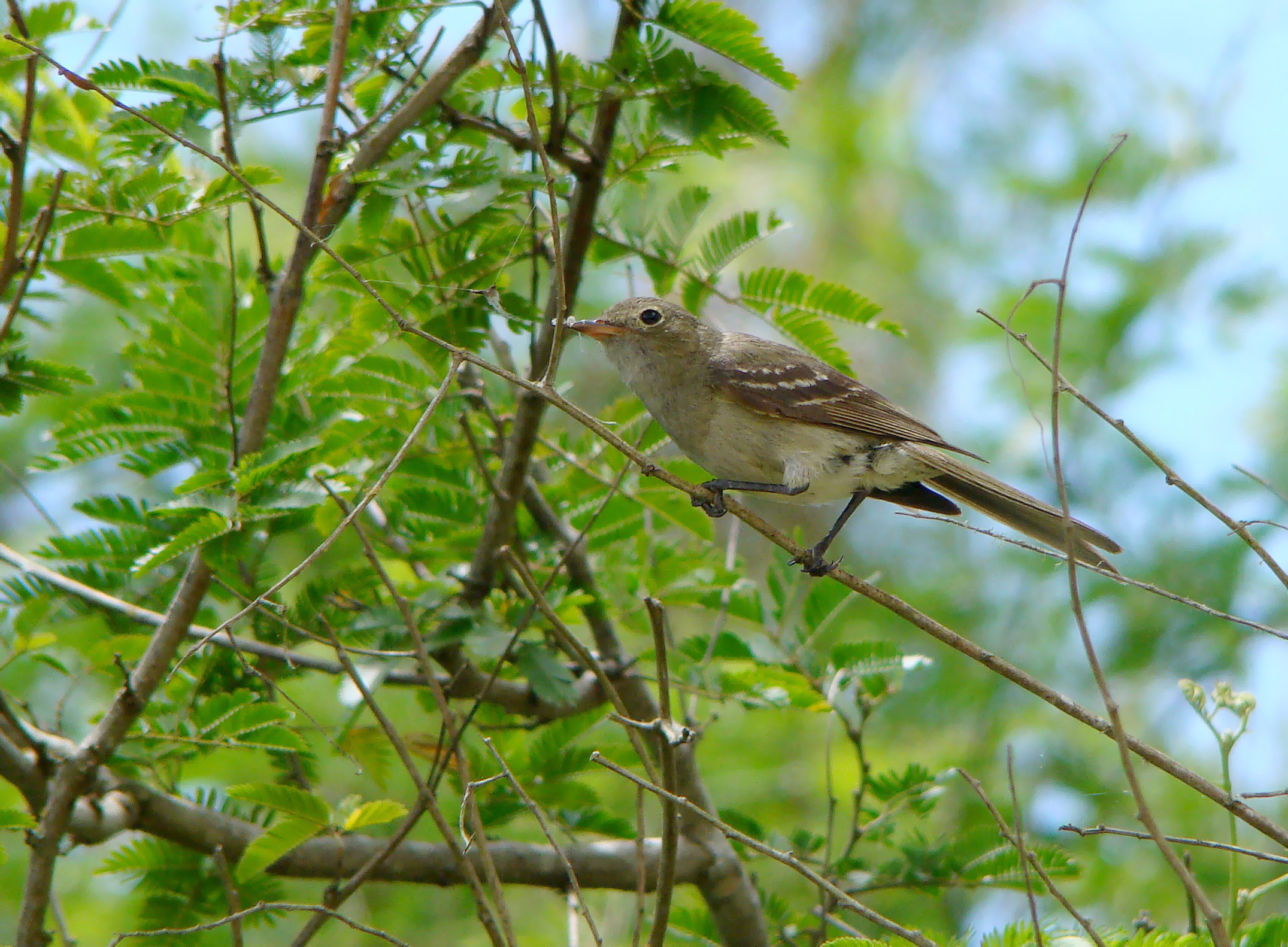

Conservation status
- Least Concern (IUCN 3.1)

Scientific classification
- Kingdom: Animalia
- Phylum: Chordata
- Class: Aves
- Order: Passeriformes
- Family: Tyrannidae
- Genus: Elaenia
- Species: E. mesoleuca

Binomial name
- Elaenia mesoleuca (Deppe, 1830)

= Olivaceous elaenia =

Species of bird

The olivaceous elaenia (Elaenia mesoleuca) is a species of bird in subfamily Elaeniinae of family Tyrannidae, the tyrant flycatchers. It is found in Argentina, Brazil, Paraguay, and Uruguay.

== Taxonomy and systematics ==
Though one mid-late twentieth century publication credited Lichtenstein with the species description, since the 1990s taxonomic systems attribute it to Deppe.

The olivaceous elaenia is monotypic.

== Description ==
The olivaceous elaenia is 14 to 16 cm (5.5 to 6.3 in) long and weighs 16 to 20 g (0.56 to 0.71 oz). It is a small elaenia without a crest. The sexes have the same plumage. Adults have a dull olive crown with minimal or no white in the middle. They have a white eyering. Their upperparts are dull olive. Their wings are dusky with yellowish or white tips on the coverts that show as two wing bars. Their flight feathers have narrow whitish edges. Their tail is dusky. Their throat is dull gray, their breast olive in a vest-like pattern, their belly white, and their flanks and undertail coverts whitish with a yellow wash. Both sexes have a brown iris, a black bill with a dusky pinkish base to the mandible, and black legs and feet.

== Distribution and habitat ==
The olivaceous elaenia is found from southern Goiás and southern Bahia in eastern Brazil south through eastern Paraguay and into eastern Uruguay and northern Argentina's Formosa, Chaco, and Misiones provinces. Its first record in Uruguay did not come until 2000. The olivaceous elaenia inhabits interior, edges, and clearings of humid tropical forest and also gallery forest, secondary forest, and more open woodlands. In elevation it ranges from sea level to 2,000 m (6,600 ft).

== Behavior ==
=== Movement ===
The olivaceous elaenia appears to be at least a partial migrant. Though the species is a year-round resident in much of its range there appears to be a northward shift during the austral winter.

=== Feeding ===
The olivaceous elaenia feeds on insects and small fruits. It captures prey and plucks fruit by gleaning while perched and also captures flying insects on the wing.

=== Breeding ===
The olivaceous elaenia's breeding season appears to span from September to April. Its nest is a cup made from moss, plant fibers, and fungal haphae with lichens on the outside. It is typically placed in a branch fork between 4 and 9 m (10 and 30 ft) above the ground. The clutch is two or three eggs. The incubation period is 15 to 16 days and fledging occurs about 20 days after hatch.

=== Vocalization ===
The olivaceous elaenia's primary vocalization is a "clapping 'Vrih' or 'Vri-der', single or in series". Other vocalizations include " 'chirr', and variety of quick single notes such as 'pic', 'oink' and 'wow' ".

== Status ==
The IUCN has assessed the olivaceous elaenia as being of Least Concern. It has a large range; its population size is not known and is believed to be decreasing. No immediate threats have been identified. It is considered locally fairly common to common and occurs in several national parks and other protected areas.
