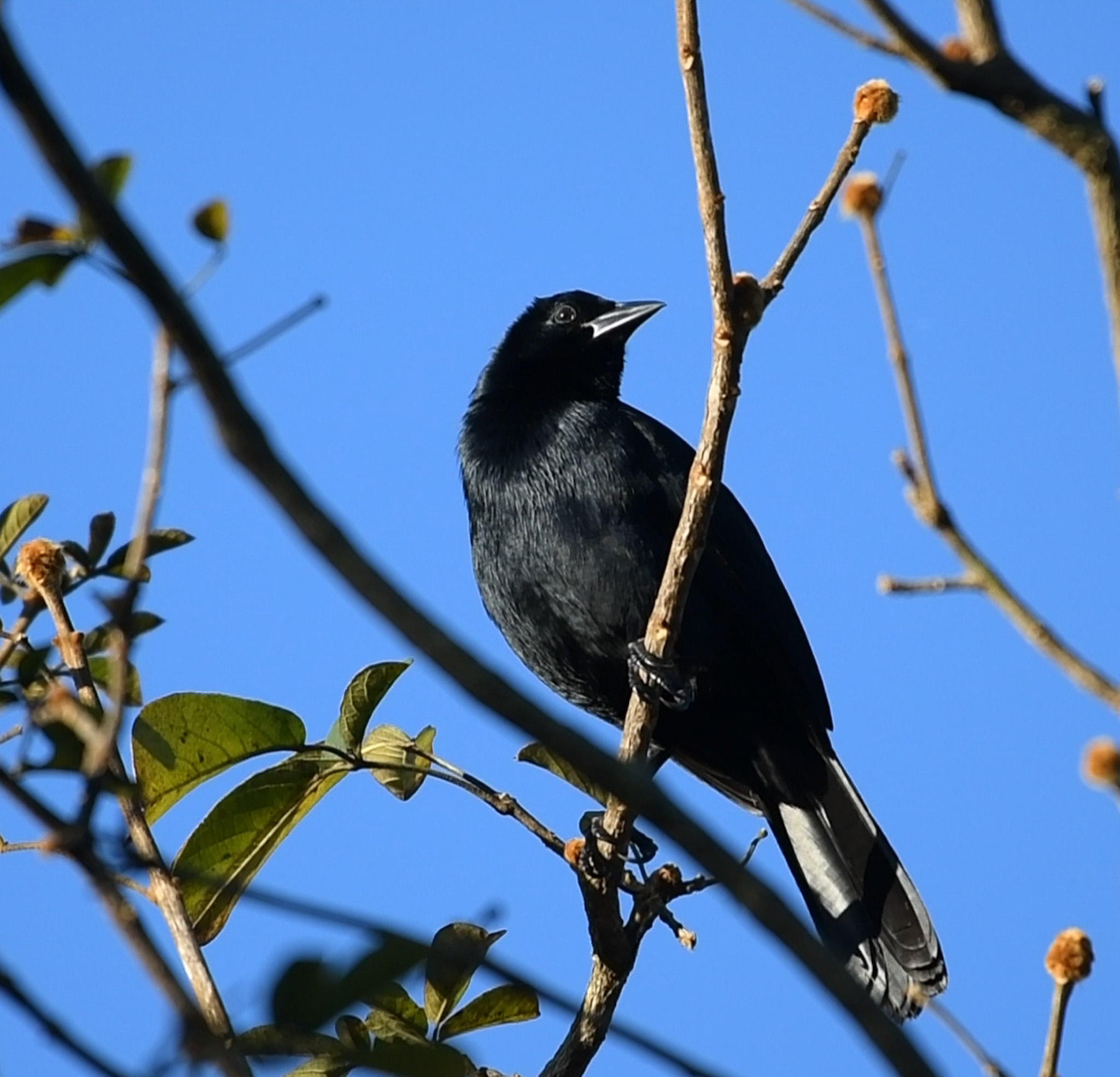
- In Costa Rica

Conservation status
- Least Concern (IUCN 3.1)

Scientific classification
- Kingdom: Animalia
- Phylum: Chordata
- Class: Aves
- Order: Passeriformes
- Family: Icteridae
- Genus: Dives
- Species: D. dives

Binomial name
- Dives dives (Deppe, 1830)

= Melodious blackbird =

Species of bird

The melodious blackbird (Dives dives) is a species of bird in the family Icteridae, the oropendolas, New World orioles, and New World blackbirds. It is found from Mexico to Costa Rica.

== Taxonomy and systematics ==
The melodious blackbird was formally described in 1830 with the binomial Icterus dives. It now shares the genus Dives with the scrub blackbird (D. warczewiczi). The two form a superspecies and some early twentieth century authors treated them as conspecific.

The melodious blackbird is monotypic.

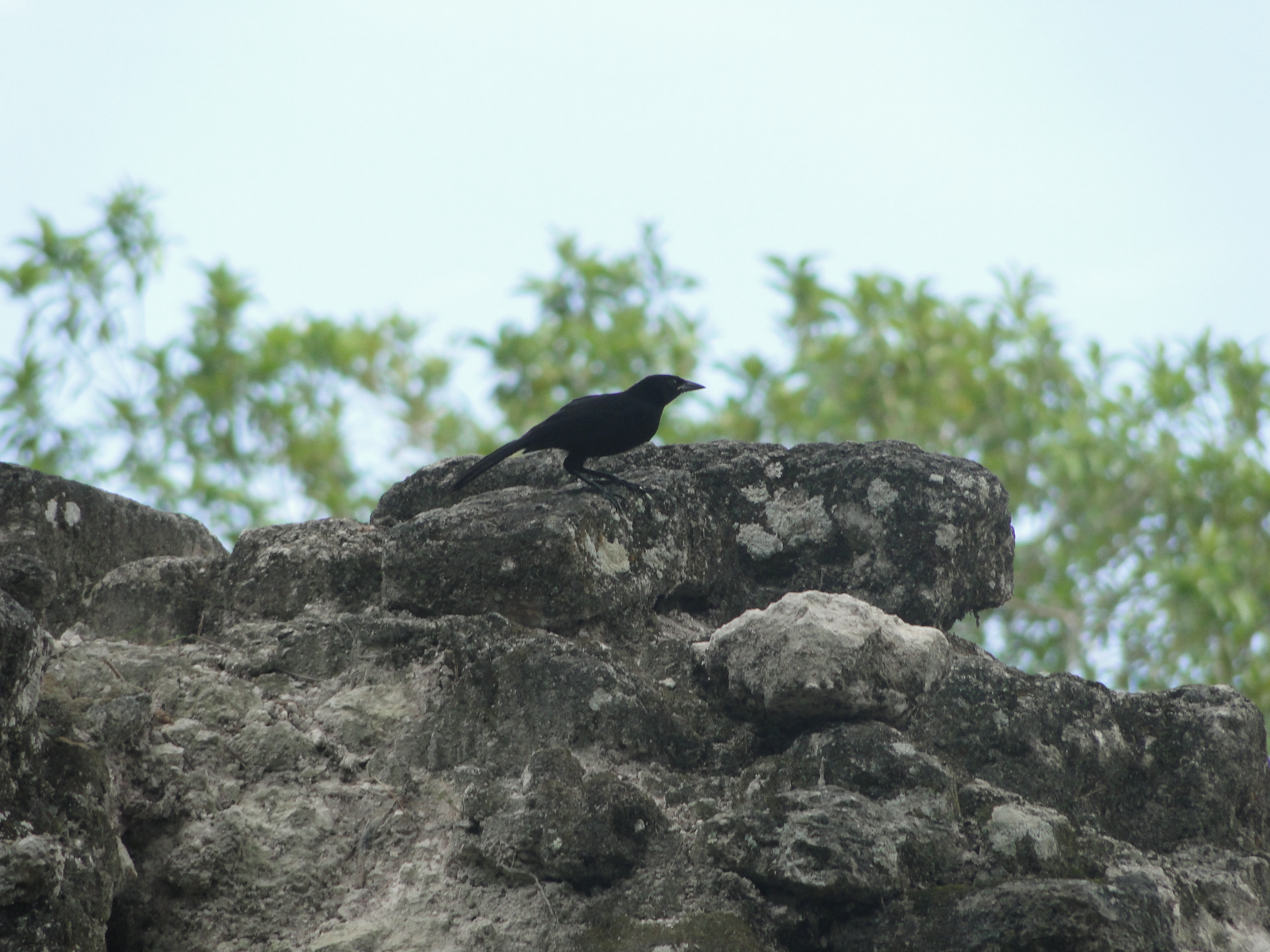
Adult bird in Belize

== Description ==
Male melodious blackbirds average 25.5 cm (10 in) long and weigh 98.3 to 102 g (3.5 to 3.6 oz). Females average 23 cm (9.1 in) long and weigh 83.4 to 95.9 g (2.9 to 3.4 oz). The species has a long tail and disproportionately large legs and feet. The sexes have the same plumage: Adults are entirely black with blue and purple iridescence. They have a dark brown iris, a black bill, and black legs and feet. Juveniles are a duller, non-glossy, brownish black.

== Distribution and habitat ==
The melodious blackbird is found from southern Tamaulipas in northeastern Mexico south on the Gulf of Mexico slope almost to the Isthmus of Tehuantepec and from there on both the Gulf/Caribbean and Pacific slopes through southern Mexico including the Yucatán Peninsula. Its range continues through Belize, Guatemala, El Salvador, Honduras, and Nicaragua. Most references either omit Costa Rica from its range or take its range only into the northern part of the country. However, a 2007 field guide to Costa Rican birds states it was "[f]irst recorded in March 1987, [and is] now widespread and fairly common". The guide's map shows it present in most of the country with the exception of the southern Cordillera de Talamanca. Another source extends its range through Costa Rica into Panama.

The melodious blackbird inhabits a variety of semi-open to open landscapes in the tropical and lower subtropical zones. These include the edges and clearings of extensive forest, open pine woodlands, gallery forest, coffee plantations, and pastures, parks, gardens, and human-inhabited areas with scattered trees. Sources differ on its elevational range. Two state it is from sea level to 2,000 m (6,600 ft) and another takes it to 2,500 m (8,200 ft). It reaches 2,100 m (6,900 ft) in Costa Rica.

== Behavior ==
=== Movement ===
The melodious blackbird is a year-round resident.

=== Feeding ===
The melodious blackbird is omnivorous; its diet includes insects, other arthropods, small vertebrates, seeds, fruit, and nectar. It primarily forages on the ground, bobbing its head as it walks, but also feeds in all parts of trees to the canopy. It has been observed picking ticks and other parasites from cattle. It exposes prey in pine cones, clusters of leaves, and other items by "gaping" (opening its bill in the substrate). It usually forages in pairs or family groups but does form large flocks that sometimes include other icterids.

=== Breeding ===
The melodious blackbird's breeding season has not been fully defined but includes at least April and May in Belize and Guatemala. The nest is a cup built by both sexes from a variety of plant fibers and often includes mud and a lining of finer fibers. It can be either well constructed or flimsy. It typically is built in a tree between about 3 and 7 m (10 and 23 ft) above the ground. The clutch is three to four eggs that are pale blue with scattered brownish to black dots. The female incubates the clutch and both parents provision nestlings. The incubation period and time to fledging are not known. Though it shares its range and habitat with the bronzed cowbird (Molothrus aeneus), it is not known to host that brood parasite.

=== Vocalization ===
Both sexes of the melodious blackbird sing, and often do so in duet. One description of its song calls is "loud and musical, a mix of mellow whistles and warbles with sudden changes in pitch". They sing from an open perch and display to each other "with pumping movements that appear almost like a dance", singing a "ringing, slightly liquid Wheeeee 'Teeuu!" that is often repeated at length. In flight it calls "a metallic tink-tink-tink" and another common call is "a loud cheep".

== Status ==
The IUCN has assessed the melodious blackbird as being of Least Concern. It has a very large range; its population of at least five million mature individuals is believed to be increasing. No immediate threats have been identified. It is considered "common to frequent" in most of its range and "fairly common" in Costa Rica.
