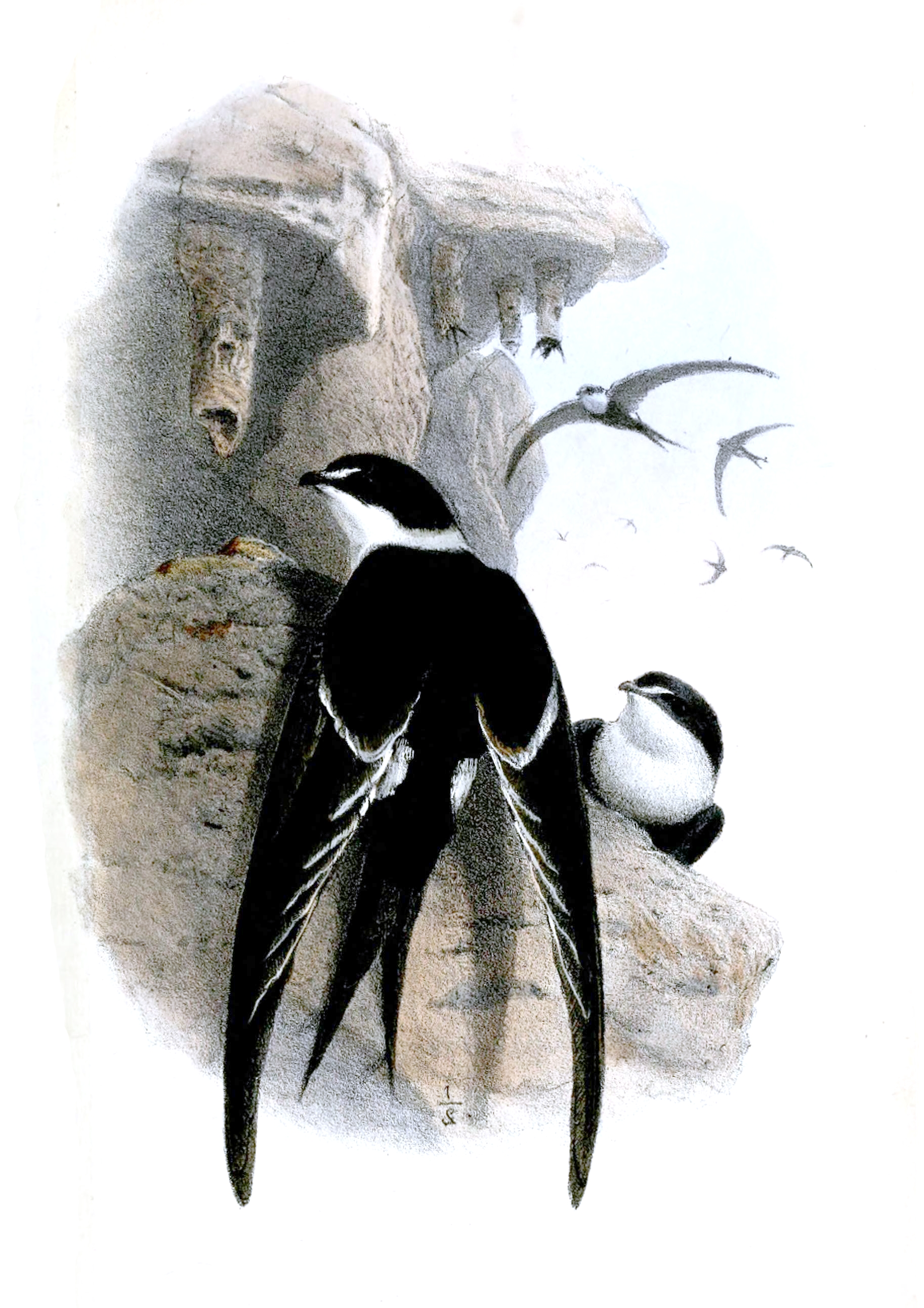

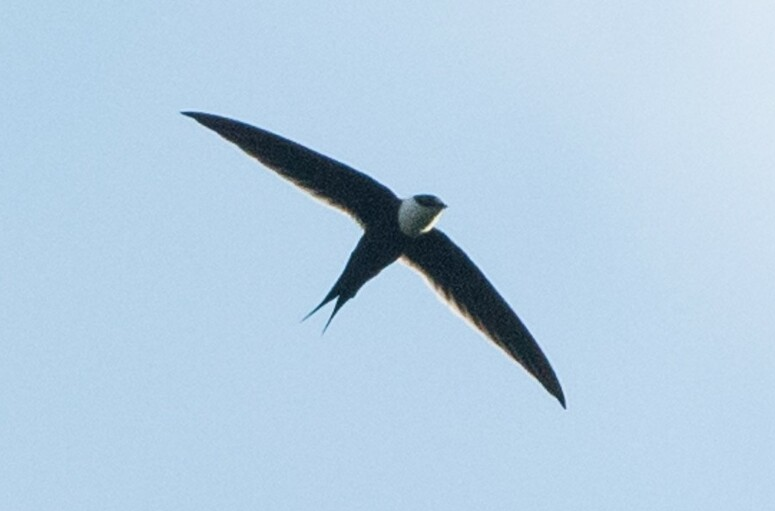

Conservation status
- Least Concern (IUCN 3.1)

Scientific classification
- Kingdom: Animalia
- Phylum: Chordata
- Class: Aves
- Order: Apodiformes
- Family: Apodidae
- Genus: Panyptila
- Species: P. sanctihieronymi

Binomial name
- Panyptila sanctihieronymi Salvin, 1863

= Great swallow-tailed swift =

Species of bird

The great swallow-tailed swift (Panyptila sanctihieronymi) is a species of bird in subfamily Apodinae of the swift family Apodidae. It is found in Costa Rica, Guatemala, Honduras, Mexico, and Nicaragua.

== Taxonomy and systematics ==
The great swallow-tailed swift shares genus Panyptila with the lesser swallow-tailed swift (P. cayennensis). It is monotypic.

== Description ==
The great swallow-tailed swift is 18 to 20.5 cm (7.1 to 8.1 in) long and weighs about 48 g (1.7 oz). It has long narrow wings and a long deeply forked tail. The sexes are alike. Adults have a black crown and upper face with two white spots on the forehead. Most of their body is bluish black. Their lower face, throat, collar, upper chest, and flanks are white. Their flight feathers have grayish ends and white tips.

== Distribution and habitat ==
The great swallow-tailed swift is found from Nayarit in western Mexico south through Guatemala and Honduras into northern Nicaragua. There are also a few records in Costa Rica. It generally inhabits arid to semi-arid highland landscapes characterized by canyons and large cliffs. In elevation it typically ranges between 1,000 and 2,000 m (3,300 and 6,600 ft) but sometimes wanders to humid areas as low as 600 m (2,000 ft).

== Behavior ==
=== Movement ===
The great swallow-tailed swift is generally a year-round resident throughout its range but some wander to Costa Rica outside the breeding season.

=== Feeding ===
Like all swifts, the great swallow-tailed swift is an aerial insectivore. It usually forages alone or in small flocks of its species. Details of its diet are lacking.

=== Breeding ===
The great swallow-tailed swift builds a tubular nest about 40 to 60 cm (16 to 24 in) long from seed fluff and feathers felted with saliva. It has an entrance near the bottom and the eggs are held on shelf towards the top. It is suspended from the underside of an overhanging rock. The clutch size is unknown but is suspected to be the same two or three eggs as that of the lesser swallow-tailed swift. Nothing else is known about its breeding biology.

=== Vocalization ===
Two vocalizations of the great swallow-tailed swift are "a plaintive, subtly bisyllabic teeuw, teeuw" and "a reedy chatter kri-kri-kri-kri-kreeuw-kreee".

== Status ==
The IUCN has assessed the great swallow-tailed swift as being of Least Concern. It has a large range and an estimated population of between 20,000 and 50,000 mature individuals. The latter is believed to be decreasing. No immediate threats have been identified. Some authors believe it is one of the rarer swifts but it appears to be common in at least Honduras.
