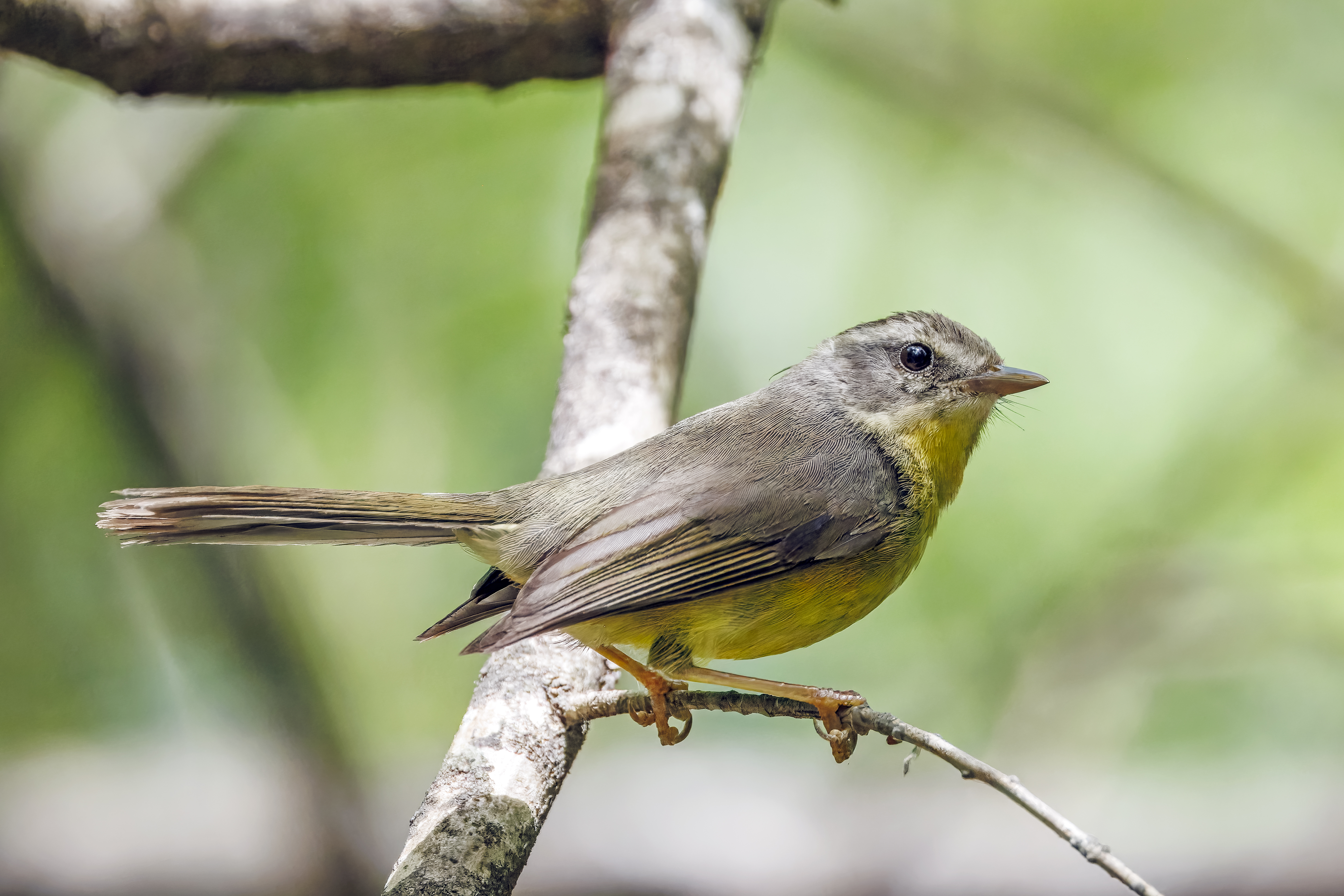
- in Colonia, Uruguay

Conservation status
- Least Concern (IUCN 3.1)

Scientific classification
- Kingdom: Animalia
- Phylum: Chordata
- Class: Aves
- Order: Passeriformes
- Family: Parulidae
- Genus: Basileuterus
- Species: B. culicivorus

Binomial name
- Basileuterus culicivorus (Deppe, 1830)
- Range

= Golden-crowned warbler =

Species of bird

The golden-crowned warbler (Basileuterus culicivorus) is a small insectivorous bird in the New World warbler family Parulidae. It has a large geographic range that extends from northeastern Mexico south to northern Argentina. The white-bellied warbler was formerly treated as a separate species but is now considered to be conspecific with the golden-crowned warbler.

== Taxonomy ==
The golden-crowned warbler was formally described in 1830 under the binomial name Sylvia culicivora by the German accountant Wilhelm Deppe in a price list of specimens that had been collected in Mexico by Wilhelm's brother Ferdinand Deppe. The specific epithet combines the Latin culex, culicis meaning "midge" and -vorus meaning "eating". The golden-crowned warbler is now one of 12 species placed in the genus Basileuterus that was introduced in 1848 by the German ornithologist Jean Cabanis. The genus name is from Ancient Greek βασιλευτερος/basileuteros meaning "more kingly".

Fourteen subspecies are recognised:

- Basileuterus culicivorus flavescens Ridgway, 1902 – central west Mexico
- Basileuterus culicivorus brasierii (Giraud Jr, 1841) – northeast, central east Mexico
- Basileuterus culicivorus culicivorus (Deppe, 1830) – central south Mexico to north Costa Rica
- Basileuterus culicivorus godmani Berlepsch, 1888 – central Costa Rica to west Panama
- Basileuterus culicivorus occultus Zimmer, JT, 1949 – west Colombia
- Basileuterus culicivorus austerus Zimmer, JT, 1949 – central Colombia
- Basileuterus culicivorus indignus Todd, 1916 – north Colombia
- Basileuterus culicivorus cabanisi Berlepsch, 1879 – northeast Colombia and northwest Venezuela
- Basileuterus culicivorus olivascens Chapman, 1893 – north, northeast Venezuela and Trinidad
- Basileuterus culicivorus segrex Zimmer, JT & Phelps, WH, 1949 – south Venezuela, west Guyana and north Brazil
- Basileuterus culicivorus auricapilla (Swainson, 1838) – central, east Brazil
- Basileuterus culicivorus azarae Zimmer, JT, 1949 – southeast, south Brazil, Paraguay, Uruguay and north Argentina
- Basileuterus culicivorus viridescens Todd, 1913 – east Bolivia
- Basileuterus culicivorus hypoleucus Bonaparte, 1850 – southwest Brazil and northeast Paraguay

The subspecies B. c. hypoleucus, with white underparts, was formerly considered to be a separate species, the white-bellied warbler. It is now treated as a conspecific with the golden-crowned warbler based partly on evidence from a molecular phylogenetic study published in 2010 which found that B. c. hypoleucus did not form a monophyletic clade within the complex.

== Description ==
The golden-crowned warbler is 12.0–13.5 cm (4.7–5.3 in) in overall length. It has grey-green upperparts and bright yellow underparts. The head is grey with a black-bordered yellow crown stripe, a yellow or white supercilium and a black eyestripe. Sexes are similar, but the immature golden-crowned warbler is duller, browner and lacks the head pattern other than the eyestripe.

The subspecies fall into four groups. The Central American culicivorus group (known as the stripe-crowned warbler) is essentially as the nominate described above, the southwestern cabanisi group (known as Cabanis's warbler) has grey upperparts and a white supercilium, the aureocapillus group (known as the golden-crowned warbler) of the southeast, has a white supercilium and orange-rufous crown stripe, and the single subspecies in the hypoleucus group (known as the white-bellied warbler) with white, not yellow, underparts that occurs in south central Brazil.

== Distribution and habitat ==
It breeds from Mexico and south through Central America to northeastern Argentina and Uruguay, and on Trinidad. It is mainly a species of lowland forests.

== Behaviour ==
The golden-crowned warbler feeds on arthropods, especially insects and spiders. Their song is a high thin pit-seet-seet-seet-seet, and the call is a sharp tsip. It lays two to four rufous-spotted white eggs in a domed nest in a bank or under leaves on the forest floor. The eggs are incubated by the female for 10 to 12 days. Parent birds will feign injury to distract potential nest predators.
