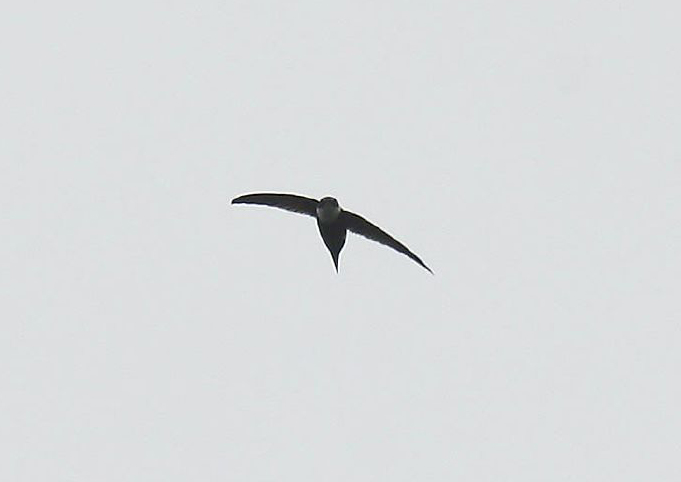

Conservation status
- Least Concern (IUCN 3.1)

Scientific classification
- Kingdom: Animalia
- Phylum: Chordata
- Class: Aves
- Clade: Strisores
- Order: Apodiformes
- Family: Apodidae
- Genus: Panyptila
- Species: P. cayennensis

Binomial name
- Panyptila cayennensis (Gmelin, JF, 1789)

= Lesser swallow-tailed swift =

Species of bird

The lesser swallow-tailed swift or Cayenne swift (Panyptila cayennensis) is a species of bird in subfamily Apodinae of the swift family Apodidae. It is found from southern Mexico through Central America; in every mainland South America country except Argentina, Chile, Paraguay, and Uruguay; and on Trinidad.

== Taxonomy and systematics ==
The lesser swallow-tailed swift was formally described in 1789 by the German naturalist Johann Friedrich Gmelin in his revised and expanded edition of Carl Linnaeus's Systema Naturae. He placed it with all the swallows and swifts in the genus Hirundo and coined the binomial name Hirundo cayennensis. Gmelin based his description on the "Martinet à collier blanc" that had been described in 1779 by the French polymath Georges-Louis Leclerc, Comte de Buffon from a specimen collected in Cayenne, French Guiana. A hand-colored illustration of the bird was also published. The lesser swallow-tailed swift is now placed with the great swallow-tailed swift in the genus Panyptila that was introduced in 1847 by the German ornithologist Jean Cabanis. The genus name combines the Ancient Greek panu meaning "very" or "exceedingly" with ptilon meaning "wing". The specific epithet cayennensis is from Cayenne, the type locality.

According to the International Ornithological Committee (IOC) the species is monotypic: no subspecies are recognized. However, the Clements taxonomy and BirdLife International's Handbook of the Birds of the World assign two subspecies, the nominate P. c. cayennensis and P. c. veraecrucis. This article follows the IOC model.

== Description ==
The lesser swallow-tailed swift is a slender species, 12.7–13 cm (5.0–5.1 in) long, and weighing about 18 g (0.63 oz). It has long narrow wings and a long forked tail, which is usually held tightly closed. It is mainly black with a white throat and upper breast and squarish white patches on the rear flanks. The sexes are similar.

== Distribution and habitat ==
The lesser swallow-tailed swift is found from eastern Mexico's Veracruz state south through every country of Central America into Colombia, Venezuela, and Ecuador. It is also found throughout the entire Amazon Basin, in a narrow strip along Brazil's southeastern coast, and on Trinidad. It inhabits the edges and clearing of lowland tropical evergreen forest and secondary forest, cultivated areas, river corridors, and human-populated areas. In elevation it reaches 1,500 m (4,900 ft) in Guatemala and Ecuador though it typically is found lower.

== Behavior ==
=== Movement and flight ===
The lesser swallow-tailed swift is a year-round resident throughout its range. Its flight is very fast and fluttery and often very high in the air.

=== Feeding ===
Like all swifts, the lesser swallow-tailed swift is an aerial insectivore. Though its diet has not been detailed, in a study in Venezuela it fed mainly on Diptera with smaller numbers of Homoptera and Hymenoptera and very small numbers from other orders. It is less gregarious than other swifts and is usually seen as individuals or pairs. If other swift species are present it will normally feed above them, although it stays below Cypseloides species such as chestnut-collared swift.

=== Breeding ===
The lesser swallow-tailed swift's breeding season varies geographically, with nesting generally in the local spring and summer. The nest is tubular, wider at the top, and with the entrance at its base. It is made of plant material felted with saliva and attached to a branch or a vertical surface. In the latter case, the entire length is fixed to the wall or trunk. Nests have been found under bridges, on the walls of occupied buildings and inside abandoned ones, and on large trees. Two or three white eggs are laid on a shelf in the upper part of the nest and incubated by both parents.

=== Vocalization ===
The lesser swallow-tailed swift's usual calls are "a reedy or wheezy phrase of fast twittering notes...'pzeee-pzi-titititititi-ti-ti-pzeee!'" and "a repeated drawn-out single 'pzeeeh'". It often flies so high that the calls cannot be heard.

== Status ==
The IUCN has assessed the lesser swallow-tailed swift as being of Least Concern. It has an extremely large range and an estimated population of at least 500,000 mature individuals. The population is believed to be slowly decreasing and no immediate threats have been identified. In various parts of its range it is considered uncommon to locally fairly common, and is "[u]sually encountered in small numbers only".
