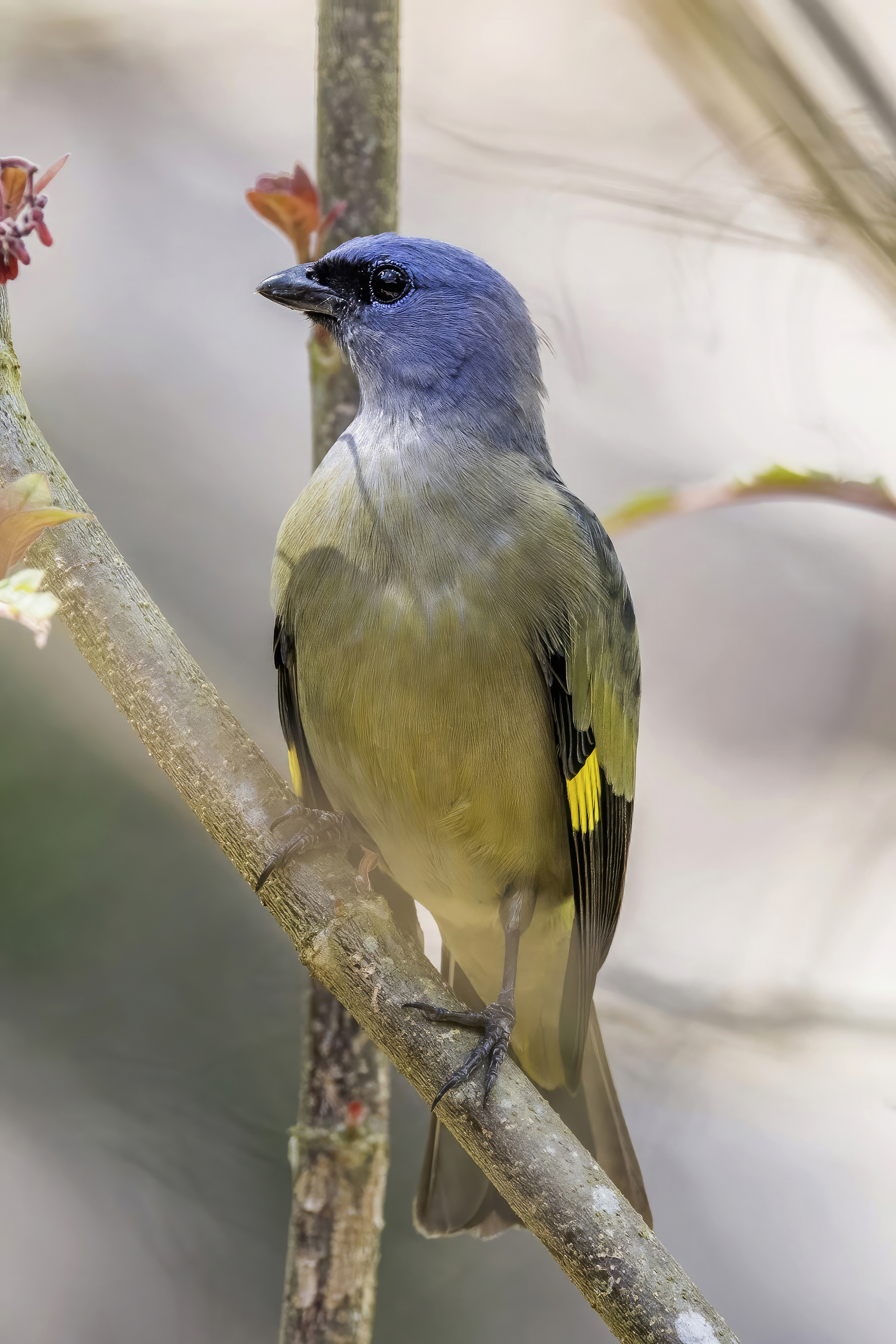

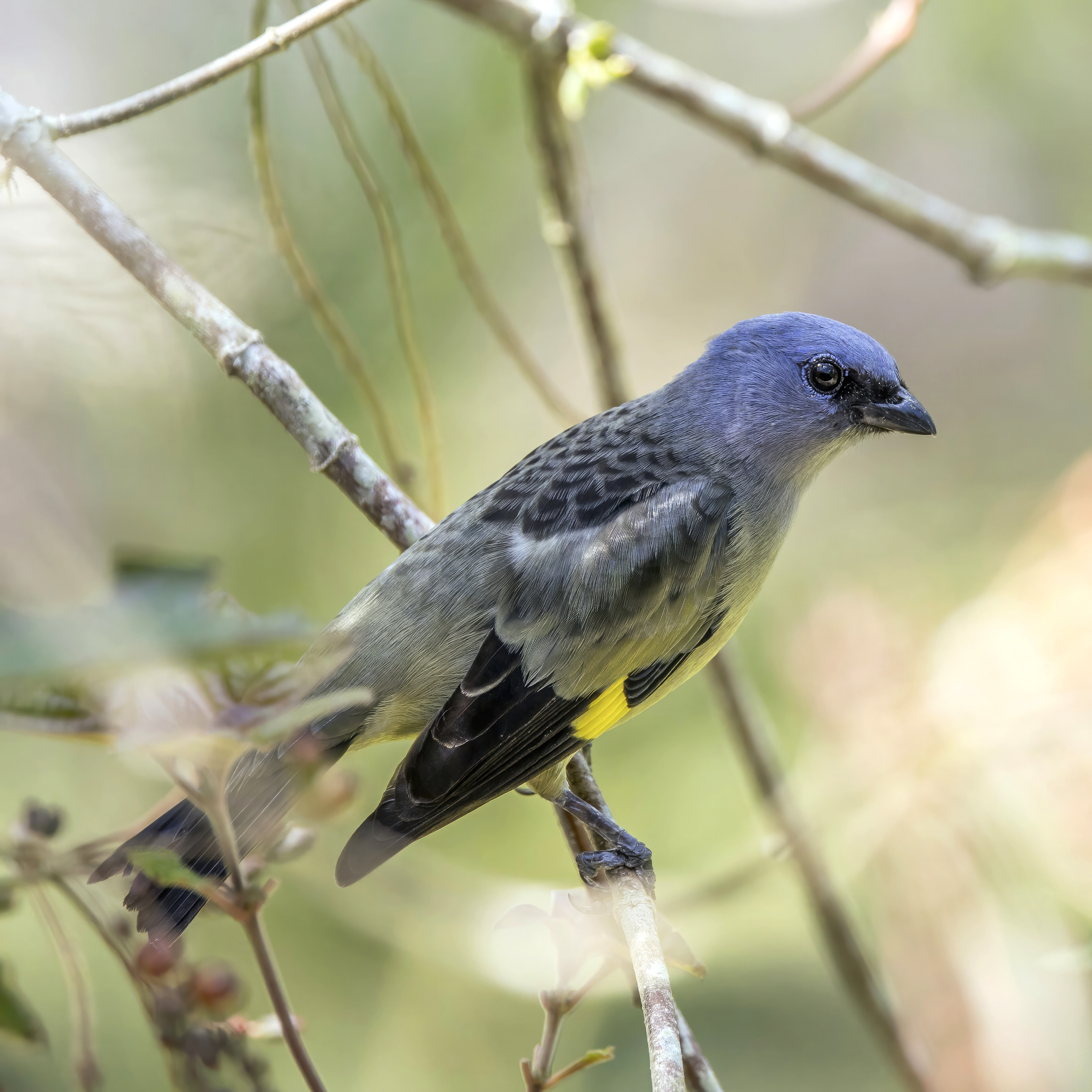
- In Belize

Conservation status
- Least Concern (IUCN 3.1)

Scientific classification
- Kingdom: Animalia
- Phylum: Chordata
- Class: Aves
- Order: Passeriformes
- Family: Thraupidae
- Genus: Thraupis
- Species: T. abbas

Binomial name
- Thraupis abbas (Deppe, 1830)

= Yellow-winged tanager =

Species of bird

The yellow-winged tanager (Thraupis abbas) is a neotropical member of the tanager family. It is of average size for a tanager, about 18-centimetre (7.1 in) long. It is distinguished by the yellow patches on its dusky green wings, marking an otherwise dark bluish and gray body. It has a pale lavender tone on its throat and breast. The juvenile lacks this color, but has an olive-green head and upper back.

== Behavior and habitat ==
Like other members of the genus Thraupis, it is a species of open humid and mesic woodland. It often forms flocks of 50 or more members. It feeds on fruit, insects, and nectar. The call is high and sibilant, and may be given in flight or while perched.

== Nest and eggs ==
The nest of the yellow-winged tanager is a small cup-shaped nest of dried fibers, leaves, and mosses. It is placed at mid-height on trees. The female lays 3 eggs, which are gray, mottled with brown.

== Range ==
The yellow-winged tanager is found on the Gulf of Mexico and Caribbean coasts from the states of Veracruz and the extreme south of San Luis Potosi in Mexico through the Yucatán Peninsula to Nicaragua, and on the Pacific coast from the Mexican state of Chiapas to Honduras. It is generally relatively common throughout this range. Since October 2010, it has been recorded in Los Chiles, northern Costa Rica.
