= Wilhelm Deppe =

German ornithologist (1800–1844)

Wilhelm Deppe born Pierre Guillaume Deppe (8 March 1800 – 15 December 1844) was an accountant at the Museum of Natural History in Berlin. His brother Ferdinand Deppe (1795–1861) collected specimens extensively in central and South America and his unpublished notes were published by Wilhelm, making him technically, the zoological name authority for several species and subspecies.

Deppe born in Berlin and baptized as Pierre Guillaume at the French Church of Berlin. His father was a trader Ferdinand Erneste Pierre Deppe and his mother was Magdelaine Fréderique née Houfselle. Ferdinand collected specimens for the Berlin museum initially but from 1829 they no longer purchased from him. In order to help his brother, Wilhelm published a catalogue of the specimens (obtained by Wilhelm Deppe and Wilhelm Schiede) along with binomial names and prices in 1830 which are considered as valid publications under the ICZN. Taxa that were described in it include:

- Tangara abbas
- Amazilia beryllina
- Campylopterus curvipennis
- Amblycercus holosericeus
- Basileuterus culicivorus
- Caryothraustes celaeno
- Buteogallus anthracinus
- Elaenia mesoleuca
- Dives dives
- Campylopterus hemileucurus
- Icteria virens auricollis
- Saltator coerulescens grandis

The list was republished in the Journal für Ornithologie, however noting it as Hinrich Lichtenstein's price list of Mexican birds in 1863 causing a lot of taxonomic confusion due to the binomial authorities now being stated as Lichtenstein.
