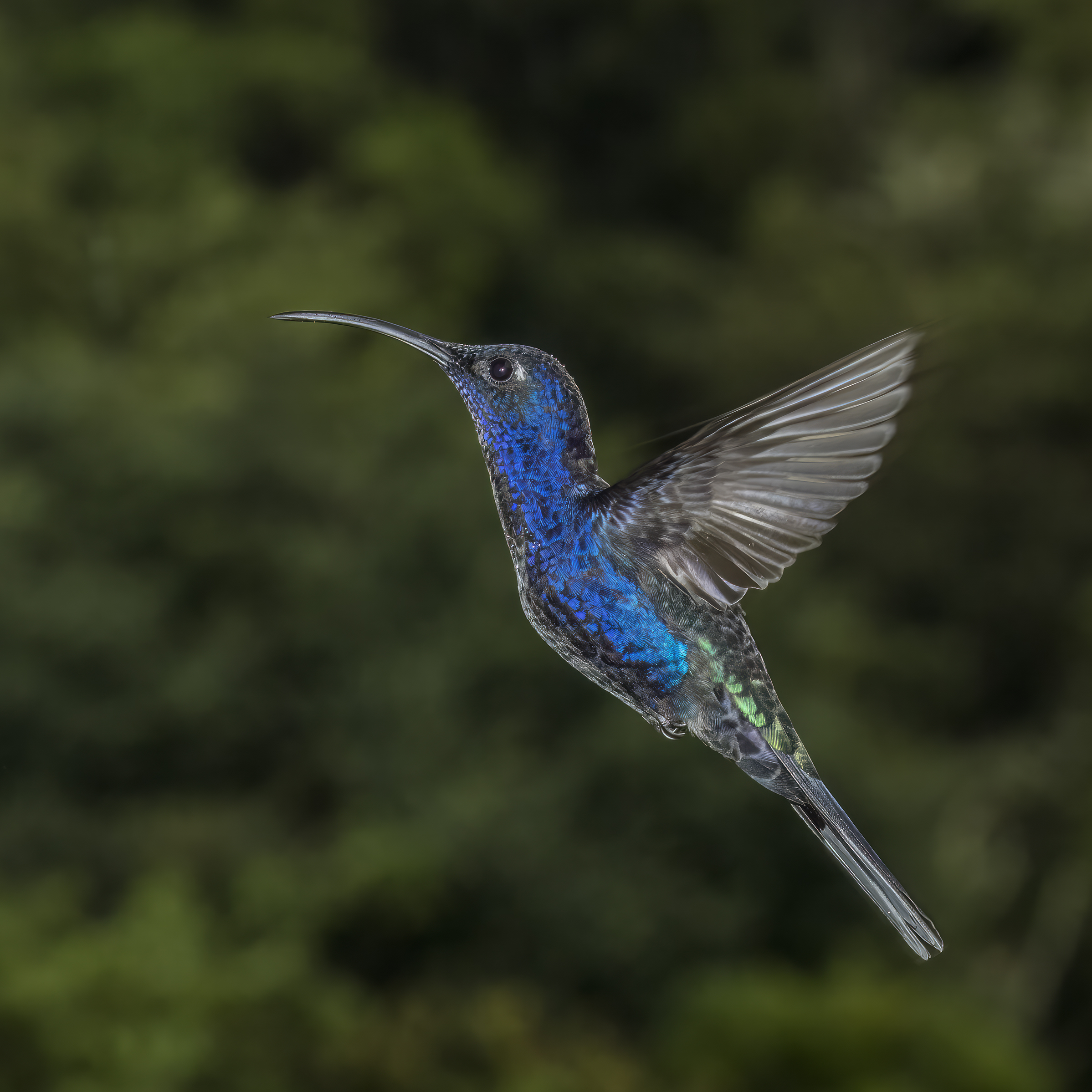
- Male, Panama

Conservation status
- Least Concern (IUCN 3.1)
- CITES Appendix II (CITES)

Scientific classification
- Kingdom: Animalia
- Phylum: Chordata
- Class: Aves
- Clade: Strisores
- Order: Apodiformes
- Family: Trochilidae
- Genus: Campylopterus
- Species: C. hemileucurus

Binomial name
- Campylopterus hemileucurus (Deppe, 1830)
- Range of C. hemileucurus

= Violet sabrewing =

Species of hummingbird

The violet sabrewing (Campylopterus hemileucurus) is a species of hummingbird in the "emeralds", tribe Trochilini of the subfamily Trochilinae. It is found from Mexico to Panama.

== Taxonomy and systematics ==
The violet sabrewing has two subspecies, the nominate C. h. hemileucurus and C. h. mellitus.

== Description ==
The violet sabrewing is the largest hummingbird of Mexico and Central America. It is 13 to 15 cm (5.1 to 5.9 in) long and weighs 9 to 12 g (0.32 to 0.42 oz). Both sexes have a black bill, though those of subspecies C. h. mellitus are longer than the nominate's. Males of the nominate subspecies have a dusky crown with a bluish green gloss. Their nape and upper back, face, and underparts are metallic violet blue that is somewhat bluer on the belly. Their lower back and uppertail coverts are metallic green. Their central tail feathers are bluish green to bluish black and the rest blackish with wide white tips. Females have a dusky crown and metallic green to bronze green upperparts with a more bluish green rump. They have a violet blue throat. Their underparts are mostly gray with a whiter belly and metallic green spots along the sides and green undertail coverts. Their central tail feathers are bluish green and the rest blacker with wide white tips.

Males of subspecies C. h. mellitus have more green on their upper parts than the nominate and almost entirely violet underparts with no blue on the belly. Female's upper-parts have a coppery tinge and their throat is violet.

== Distribution and habitat ==
The nominate subspecies of violet sabrewing is found from the Mexican states of Guerrero and Veracruz intermittently south through Guatemala, southern Belize, Honduras, and El Salvador into northern Nicaragua. Subspecies C. h. mellitus is found most of the length of Costa Rica into western Panama. The species inhabits the edges and interior of humid evergreen montane forest and mature secondary forest, banana plantations, and gardens. In Mexico, it generally ranges in elevation between 500 and 2,000 m (1,600 and 6,600 ft) but occurs as high as 2,500 m (8,200 ft). In Costa Rica, it ranges between 1,500 and 2,400 m (4,900 and 7,900 ft).

== Behavior ==
=== Movement ===
The violet sabrewing is mostly sedentary, but individuals frequently move to lower elevations after the breeding season.

=== Feeding ===
The violet sabrewing feeds on nectar primarily by trap-lining, visiting a circuit of flowering plants. Males occasionally defend patches of flowers and are dominant over other hummingbirds. The species forages mostly in the understory, often on Heliconia, banana (Musa), Cephalism, and Palic urea though it visits others as well. It frequents nectar (sugar water) feeders and chases other hummingbirds from them. In addition to nectar, violet sabrewings also eat arthropods gleaned from foliage and spiderwebs.

=== Breeding ===
The violet sabrewing breeds during the local rainy season, which ranges from June to September in Mexico and May to November in Costa Rica. In the latter country they may raise two broods. Males court females by singing in leks, typically in the understory or at the forest edge. The nest is a cup of moss cemented with spiderwebs and lined with fine fibers. In Costa Rica it is often built above a ravine or stream, on a horizontal branch 1 to 6 m (3 to 20 ft) above the ground. The female incubates the clutch of two eggs for 19 to 22 days and fledging occurs 22 to 24 days after hatch.

=== Vocalization ===
The violet sabrewing's song has been described as "cheep tsew cheep tik-tik tsew cheep ..., high-pitched, piercing and ventriloquial" and as "varied, loud, sharp chipping and warbles, often punctuated with fairly shrill, slightly explosive notes". Its calls are "high, sharp chippering", "prolonged, hard chipping", and "single sharp chips given in flight."

== Status ==
The IUCN has assessed the violet sabrewing as being of Least Concern. It has a very large range and a population of at least 50,000 mature individuals, though the latter is believed to be decreasing. No specific threats have been identified. "This species can tolerate habitat disturbance, however, as long as some forest cover or tall second growth persists."
