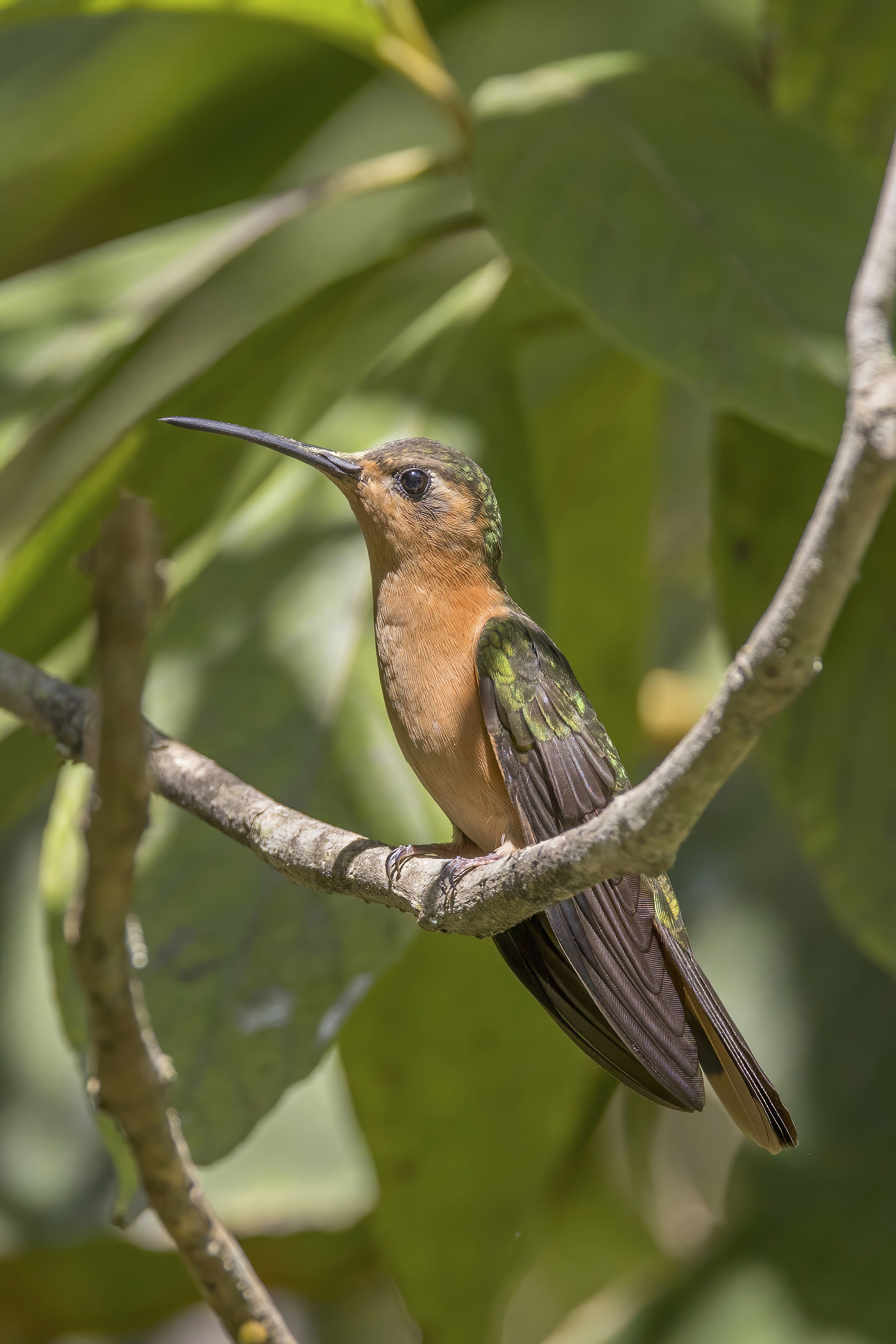

Conservation status
- Least Concern (IUCN 3.1)
- CITES Appendix II

Scientific classification
- Kingdom: Animalia
- Phylum: Chordata
- Class: Aves
- Order: Apodiformes
- Family: Trochilidae
- Genus: Pampa
- Species: P. rufa

Binomial name
- Pampa rufa (Lesson, 1840)

Synonyms
- Campylopterus rufus

= Rufous sabrewing =

Species of hummingbird

The rufous sabrewing (Pampa rufa) is a species of hummingbird in the "emeralds", tribe Trochilini of subfamily Trochilinae. It is found in El Salvador, Guatemala, and Mexico.

== Taxonomy and systematics ==
The rufous sabrewing was originally described as Pampa rufus, later moved to genus Campylopterus, and later still restored to Pampa with the specific epithet revised to match its gender to the genus. The North American Classification Committee of the American Ornithological Society, the International Ornithological Committee (IOC), and the Clements taxonomy have adopted the binomial P. rufa. However, BirdLife International's Handbook of the Birds of the World (HBW) retained it as Campylopterus rufus.

The taxonomic systems agree that the rufous sabrewing is monotypic.

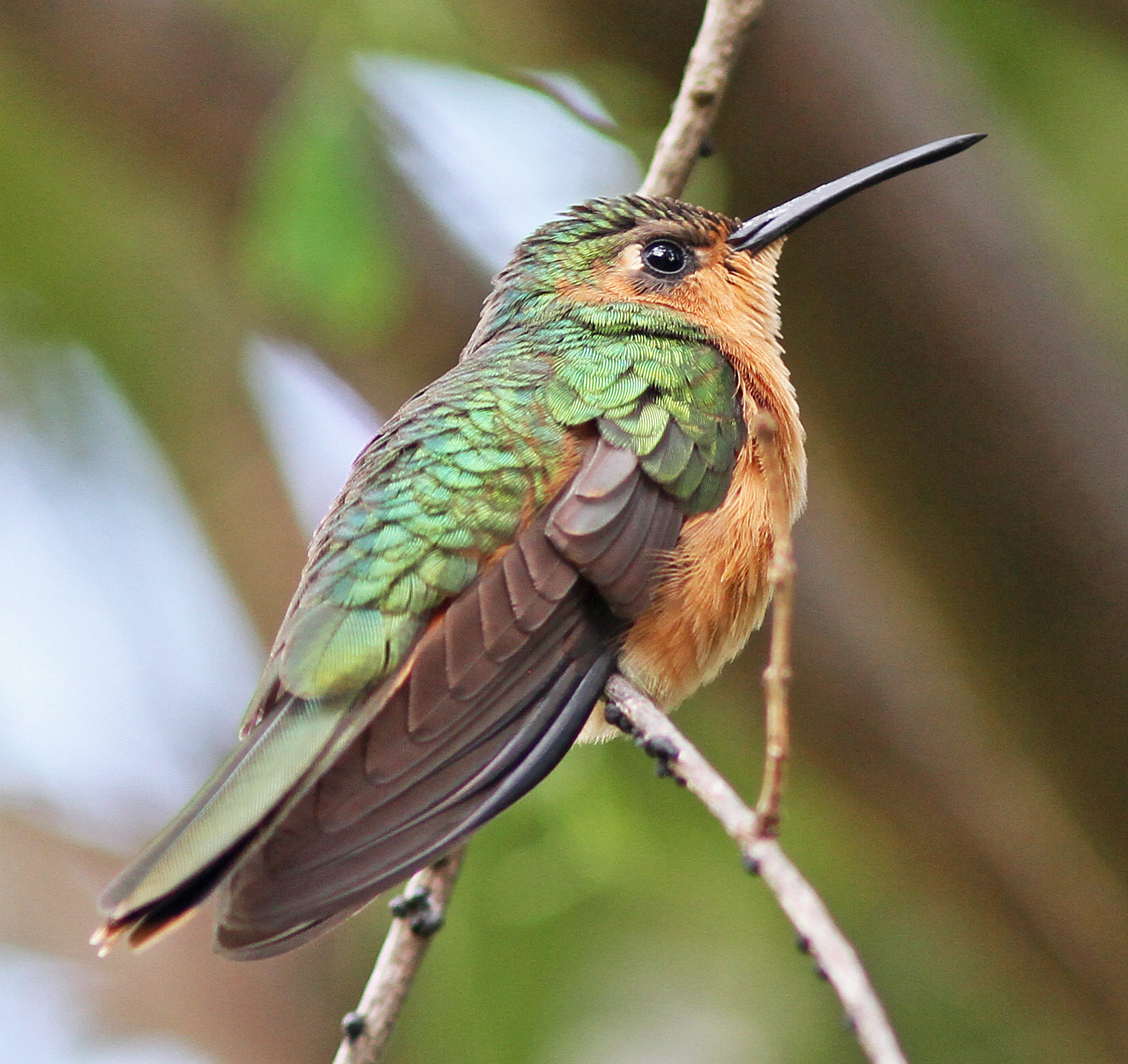
Lake Atitlan, Guatemala

== Description ==
The rufous sabrewing is 12.1 to 14 cm (4.8 to 5.5 in) long and weighs an average of 7.5 g (0.26 oz). Its black bill is straight, stout, and broad. The sexes have essentially the same plumage. Their upperparts are bright metallic bronze green to greenish bronze; the crown is slightly darker and duller and the uppertail coverts are more bronzy. Their face is cinnamon with a white spot behind the eye and their underparts are cinnamon that is slightly paler down the center. Their central pair of tail feathers is metallic bronze to greenish bronze. The next pair is similar with a wide diffuse blackish band near the end and cinnamon tips. The next two pairs have cinnamon bases with a sharper blackish band and cinnamon tips. The outermost pair's outer web is cinnamon.

== Distribution and habitat ==
The rufous sabrewing is found on the western slope of highlands from Sierra Madre de Chiapas in the Mexican state of Oaxaca southeast through Guatemala into El Salvador as far as Volcán de San Salvador in El Boquerón National Park. It inhabits the interior and edges of humid evergreen montane forest, pine-oak forest, and coffee and other plantations. In elevation it ranges between 900 and 2,000 m (3,000 and 6,600 ft) but is most abundant above 1,300 m (4,300 ft).

== Behavior ==
=== Movement ===
The rufous sabrewing is thought to be mostly sedentary, though it may make elevational changes or move about seeking nectar sources.

=== Feeding ===
The rufous sabrewing forages for nectar at a variety of flowering plants, shrubs, and trees, though its diet has not been greatly studied. In mostly stays low, often in the understory, but will forage as high as the canopy at the forest edge. Males defend nectar-rich feeding territories. In addition to nectar, the species feeds on small insects captured by hawking from a perch.

=== Breeding ===
Males sing to court females at leks in dense understory. Females make a small cup nest of moss lined with thistle down and covered with lichen; some of the moss hangs down as a "beard". It is placed on a thin branch, usually an exposed one within about 2 m (7 ft) of the ground. The female incubates the clutch of two eggs for 15 to 16 days and fledging occurs 23 to 26 days after hatch.

=== Vocalization ===
The rufous sabrewing's song is "varied, strong, squeaky chipping and chattering, also short, rich, warbled phrases." It also makes "a shart, nasal squihk, a slightly more metallic pli'ik, and a hard, chipping chi'ilrr chik-chik-chik-chik" calls.

== Status ==
The IUCN has assessed the rufous sabrewing as being of Least Concern. Though its population is estimated at 20,000 to 50,000 mature individuals, it has a restricted range and the population is believed to be decreasing. No specific threats have been identified. Mexico considers its "a species under special protection" but there is no conservation program for it.
