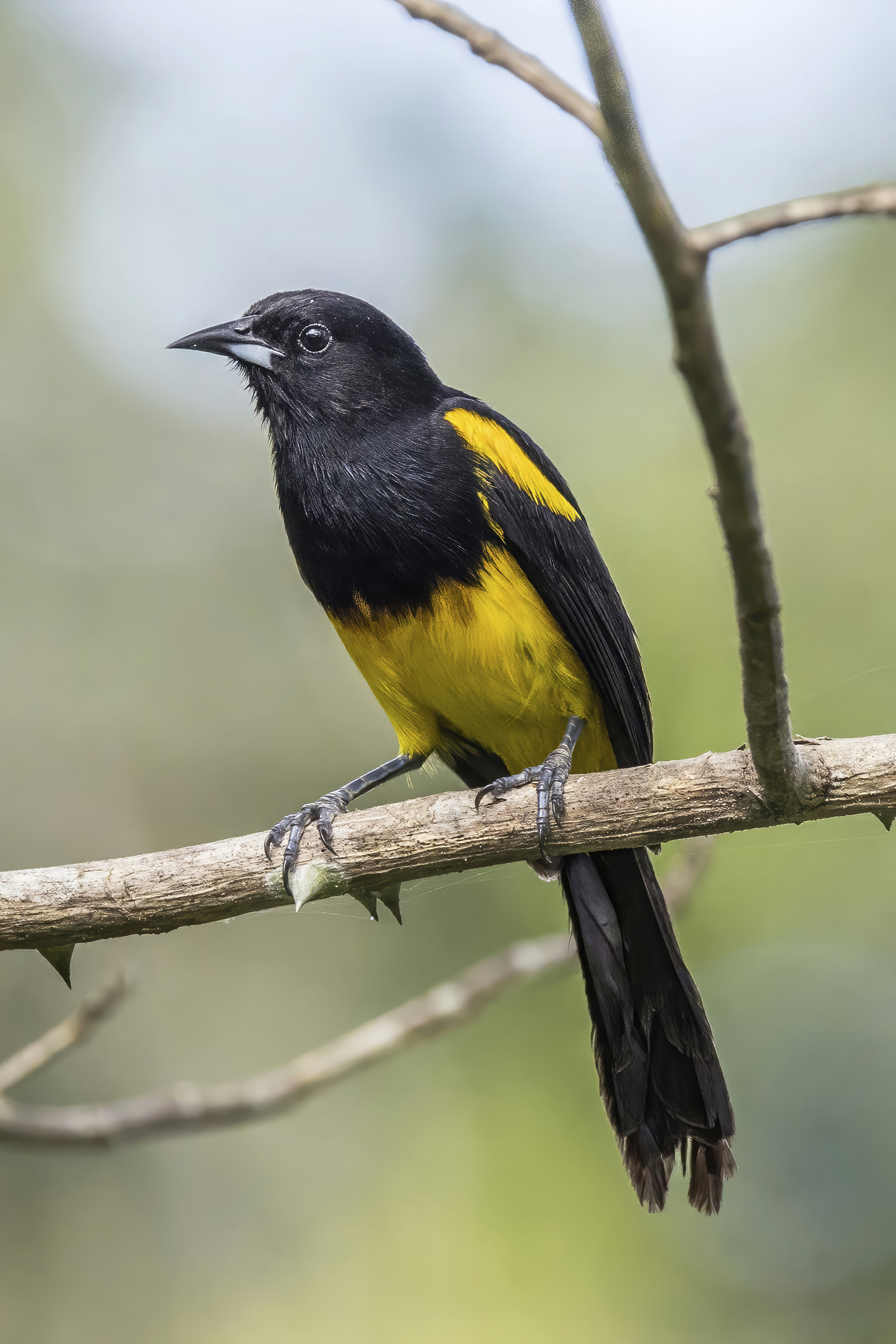
- I. p. prosthemelas in Belize

Conservation status
- Least Concern (IUCN 3.1)

Scientific classification
- Kingdom: Animalia
- Phylum: Chordata
- Class: Aves
- Order: Passeriformes
- Family: Icteridae
- Genus: Icterus
- Species: I. prosthemelas

Binomial name
- Icterus prosthemelas (Strickland, 1850)
- Range

Synonyms
- Xanthornus prosthemelas (Strickland, 1850); Xanthornus lessoni (Cabanis, 1851); Pendulinus lessoni (Pucheran, 1854); Pendulinus prosthemelas (Cassin, 1857); Icterus dominicensis prosthemelas (Bond, 1947)

= Black-cowled oriole =

Species of bird (Icterus prosthemelas) in Central America

The black-cowled oriole (Icterus prosthemelas) is a species of bird in the family Icteridae. It is common and widespread in the Caribbean lowlands and foothills from southern Mexico to western Panama. It lives primarily in humid or semihumid forest, as well as in clearings, along forest edges, in plantations, in semi-open areas with scattered trees and bushes, and in gardens. The adult male is black, with yellow on the belly, shoulder, rump, wing lining, and crissum. The female's plumage varies depending on location. In the south of its range, it is similar to that of the male. In the north, its crown and upperparts are olive-yellow, while its face, throat, upper breast, wings, and tail are black.

It forages mostly at mid-levels, and its diet includes a mix of arthropods, nectar and fruit. The female lays three eggs in a shallow pendent nest, which is stitched to the underside of a large leaf. Both parents defend the nest, and brood and feed the young. Due to its very large range and apparently stable population, it is considered by the International Union for Conservation of Nature to be a species of least concern.

First described by Hugh Strickland in 1850, the black-cowled oriole has at times been considered conspecific with several oriole species from the Greater Antilles. There are two subspecies, I. p. prosthemelas and I. p. praecox, which differ in their juvenile plumage.

== Taxonomy and systematics ==
English ornithologist Hugh Strickland first described the black-cowled oriole in 1850, using a specimen collected in Guatemala. That type specimen resides at the Academy of Natural Sciences of Drexel University in Philadelphia, Pennsylvania. Strickland named it Xanthornus prosthemelas. Philip Sclater moved it to the genus Icterus in 1856, and most taxonomists followed suit, though a few put it in the now-defunct genus Pendulinus instead. It was considered a distinct species until 1947, when ornithologist James Bond lumped it with oriole species found on various islands in the Greater Antilles. He named them all Icterus dominicensis. However, molecular studies done since have shown that its genetics vary significantly from those of the Antillean species, and taxonomists elevated it to full species status again in 2000. Those same studies showed that its closest relative is the orchard oriole.

Taxonomists recognize two subspecies, which differ in juvenile plumage:

- I. p. prosthemelas, described by Strickland in 1850, is found from Mexico to central Costa Rica.
- I. p. praecox, described in 1965 by Allan Phillips and Robert Dickerman, is found from southeastern Costa Rica to western Panama.

The genus name Icterus comes from the Ancient Greek ikteros, meaning "yellow bird". The Greek word may originally have referred to the European golden oriole. The specific epithet prosthemelas is a combination of the Greek words prosthen, meaning "front" and melas, meaning "black". In the past, it was also known as Lesson's oriole.

== Description ==
The black-cowled oriole is a medium-sized passerine, ranging in length from 18.5 to 21 cm (7.3 to 8.3 in). (Note: By convention, length is measured from the tip of the bill to the tip of the tail on a dead bird (or skin) laid on its back.) Males are larger and heavier than females, averaging 32.5 g (1.15 oz) while females average only 27.5 g (0.97 oz). In the north of the range, males and females are sexually dimorphic, while in the south, their plumages are similar. In both sexes, the bill is slender, slightly decurved, and black, with a silvery base to the lower mandible. The adult male's plumage is mostly black, with bright yellow patches on the shoulder, rump, and uppertail coverts. The wing lining, lower breast, thighs, and crissum are completely yellow, with a narrow wash of chestnut between the black and yellow on the breast. Where the female's plumage differs, she has a black face, throat and upper breast, with an olive-yellow crown and upperparts. Some females, particularly further south in the range, show a mix of black and yellow feathers on the head and back, while others have entirely black heads, and still others fully resemble males. Both sexes have blue-gray legs and feet, and brown eyes.

The immature of I. p. praecox is dull yellow-olive above and dull yellow below; the feathers on its back have black bases, which sometimes show through. Its face, forehead and throat are matte black, as are its wings and tail. This plumage is retained for a year, though individual, heavily worn, feathers may be replaced.

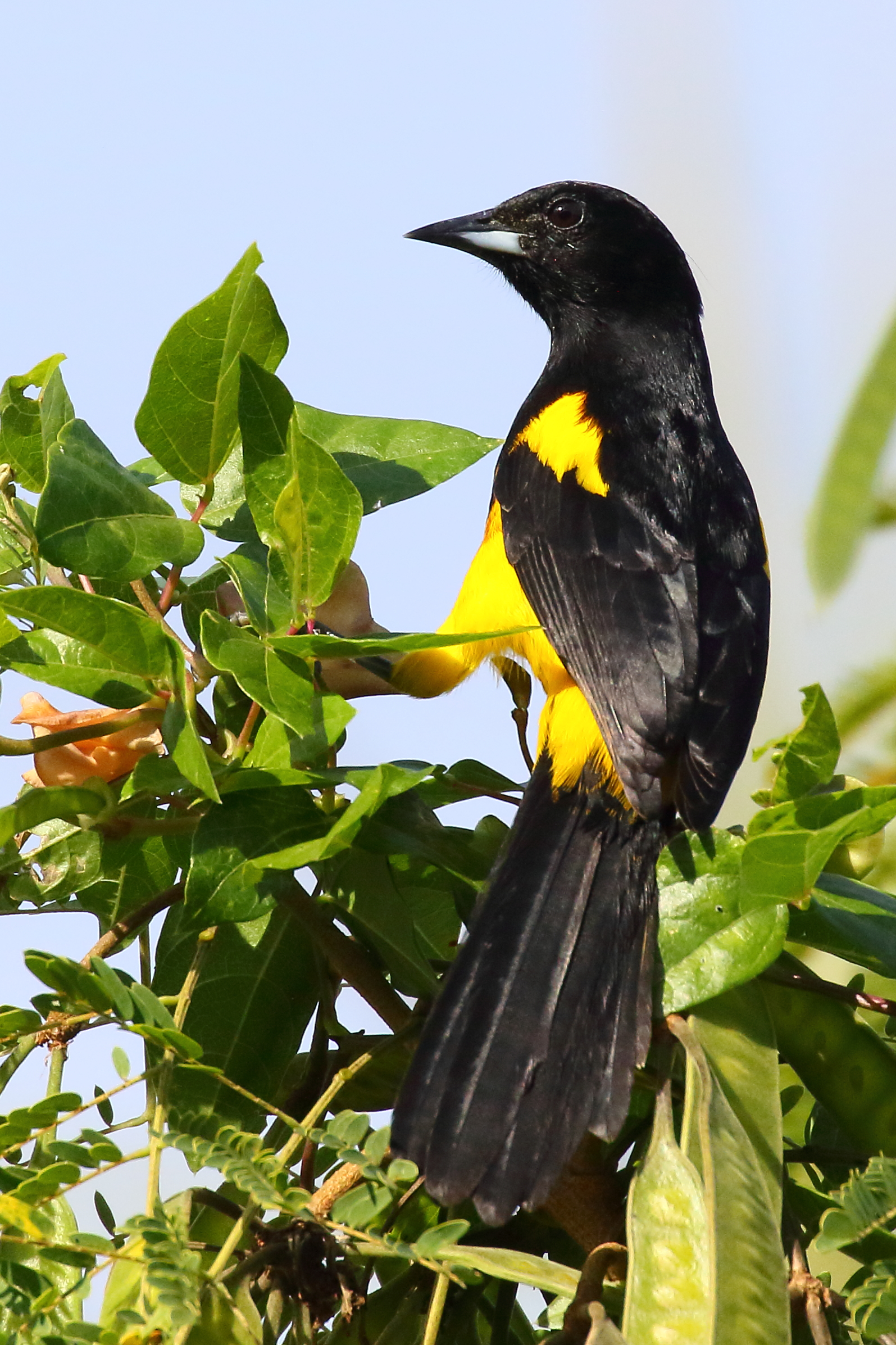
all-black head, back, wings, and tail of North Central America population

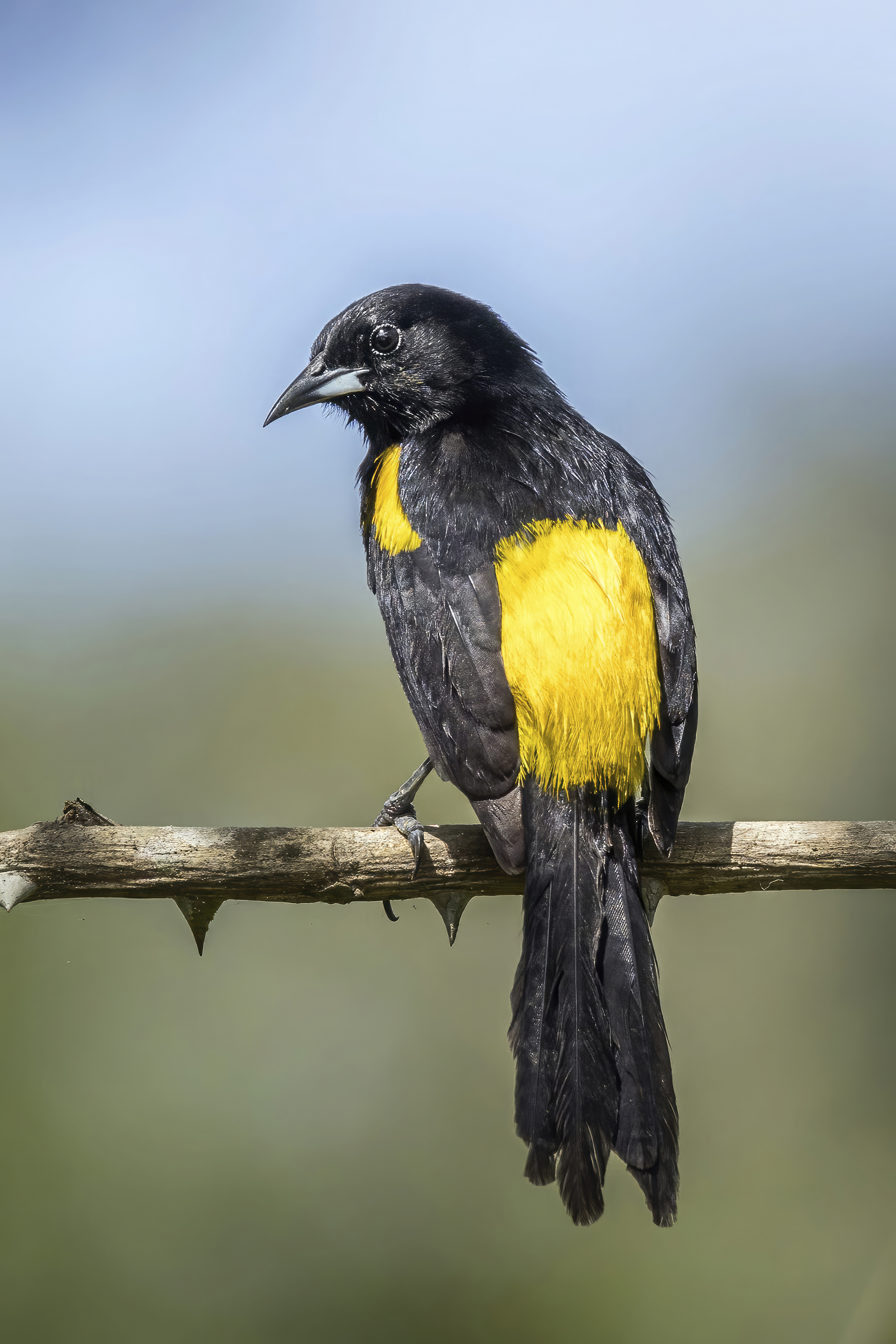
yellow back of South Central America population

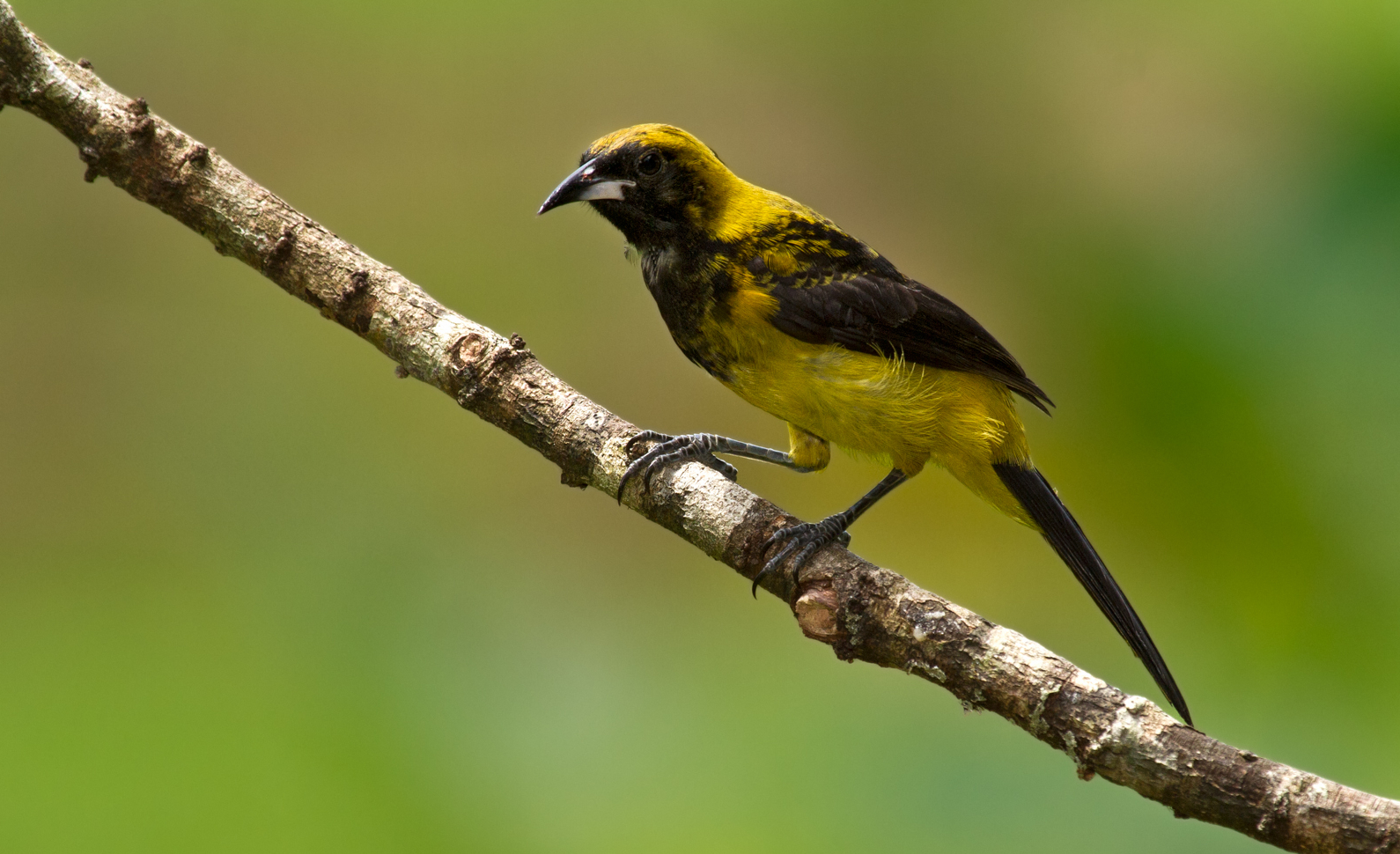
some Northern females and immature birds show yellow on the crown and back

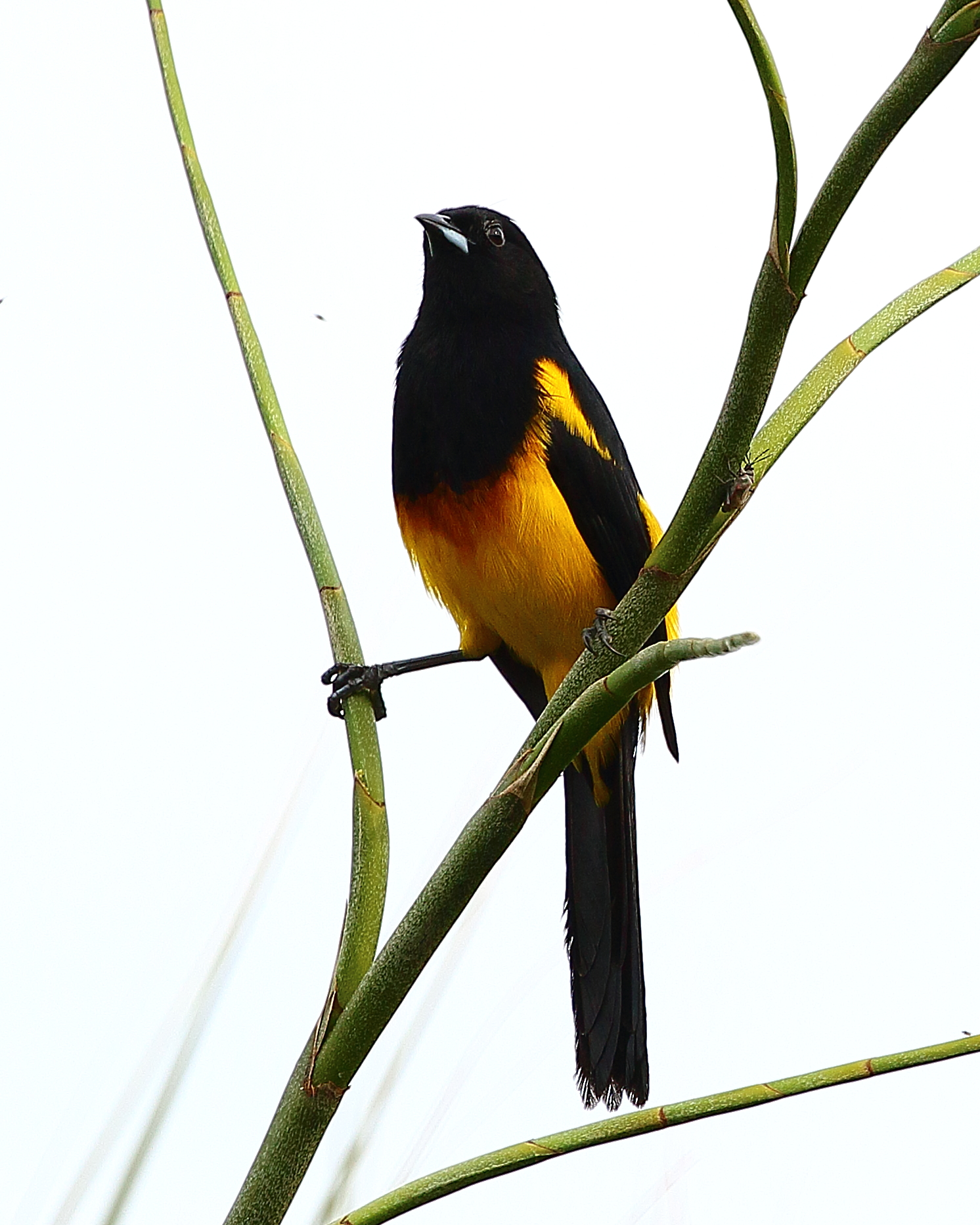
yellow crissum distinguishes this species from the otherwise similar black-vented oriole

=== Vocalizations ===
The bird's song is a fairly quiet, complicated series of soft, whistled notes and harsher chattering. These are described as being variously clear, metallic, slurred and mellow, and are delivered in an apparently random order. Its calls include a scratchy, rising weet, a nasal deep, a nasal eeaahnk, a quiet tee-u, and a sharper beehk or bihk. When alarmed, it gives a scolding series of sharp cherp and chep notes, variously transcribed as cheh-cheh-cheh-chek and churr'churr'churr, sometimes interspersed with snatches of song.

=== Similar species ===
The juvenile black-cowled oriole resembles both the yellow-tailed oriole and the juvenile orchard oriole, but can be distinguished by its completely black tail and its lack of wing bars. It is larger than an orchard oriole and much smaller than a yellow-tailed oriole. Though the black-cowled oriole looks similar to the black-vented oriole, the two species are allopatric and live in different habitats; the black-vented oriole is found in dry highlands. The black-vented oriole is larger, bulkier, and longer-tailed, with a black crissum, an orangey-yellow belly, and a longer, straighter beak. Immature birds show less black on the face than do immature black-cowled orioles. Female and immature black-cowled orioles can be confused with the yellow-backed oriole, but that species is brighter yellow on the head and back, with less black on the face, and a stouter, straighter bill. Females and immatures also resemble the female bar-winged oriole, but that species is probably allopatric (found only on the Pacific slope), and typically has less dark wings and tail, and a pale wing bar. Audubon's oriole, which is seldom found in the same habitat or range, is larger, with a heavier, straight beak and tertials which are edged in white in fresh plumage.

== Distribution and habitat ==
The black-cowled oriole occurs throughout much of eastern Central America, from southern Mexico through western Panama. It lives in the Caribbean lowlands and foothills at elevations from sea level to 1,300 m (4,300 ft), though primarily below 500 m (1,600 ft). It is fairly common across its range. In the early 21st century, it expanded its range to the Pacific slope of Costa Rica, with scattered reports of sightings in the central and southern lowlands. It is found in humid and semihumid forest, including in clearings and along edges, as well as in more open areas with scattered bushes and trees. In forested areas, it is generally located along waterways. It favors open woodland and plantations, especially banana plantations, and is regularly associated with palms. In the southern part of its range, it prefers more open habitats, including gardens, forest edges, and second growth.

== Behavior and ecology ==
The black-cowled oriole is a resident species. It doesn't migrate, and has not been reliably recorded anywhere as a vagrant. It typically moves in pairs or small groups, and often accompanies mixed-species flocks. It mixes regularly with other oriole species. It roosts in loose groups in tall grass, and youngsters sometimes travel together in flocks.

=== Breeding and nesting ===
The black-cowled oriole is thought to be a monogamous species. It builds a shallow, pendent nest, which typically measures about 8 cm (3.1 in) in depth. The nest is situated 5–35 ft (1.5–10.7 m) above the ground. Made of fine, pale fibers, it is typically suspended from the midrib of a large-leafed plant, such as a heliconia, palm, or banana. Sometimes, a fold at the edge of the leaf is used instead of the midrib. The oriole makes holes in the leaf and laces fibers through the holes to hang the nest. Occasionally, pairs build under the eaves of a house, hanging the nest from nails or wires. Black-cowled orioles breed solitarily, though pairs in the Yucatán Peninsula sometimes nest in or near orange oriole colonies. The female lays three eggs, which are white with brown speckles and measure 23 mm (0.91 in) in length. Both parents defend the nest and both brood and feed the nestlings.

=== Feeding ===
The black-cowled oriole eats a mixed diet of arthropods, fruits, and nectar, poking and prodding among plant foliage for prey, and sometimes hanging head downward to remove prey from the underside of leaves. It forages at mid-level, often in palms, and takes fruits from trees including various Cecropia species, Talisia olivaeformis, Ehretia tinifolia, Stemmadenia donnell-smithii, Bursera simaruba, and Trophis racemosa. It takes nectar from the flowers of a variety of epiphytes, (including Columnea species) and from tree species including Bernoullia flammea, various Inga species, bananas, and Erythrina costaricensis, pollinating them in the process.

== Status and threats ==
The International Union for Conservation of Nature considers the black-cowled oriole to be a species of least concern, due to its large range and apparently stable population numbers. Population estimates made by Partners in Flight range from 50,000 to 499,000 individuals, with no evidence of declines or serious threats to the species. Due primarily to the bird's striking colors, Costa Ricans regularly capture and cage the species for pets.

Black-cowled orioles serve as prey for several species. They respond to playback of the ferruginous pygmy owl, suggesting that they recognize the species as a threat. Roadside hawks have been documented taking them in flight several times. Researchers have isolated the Venezuelan equine encephalomyelitis virus from a black-cowled oriole in Panama.
