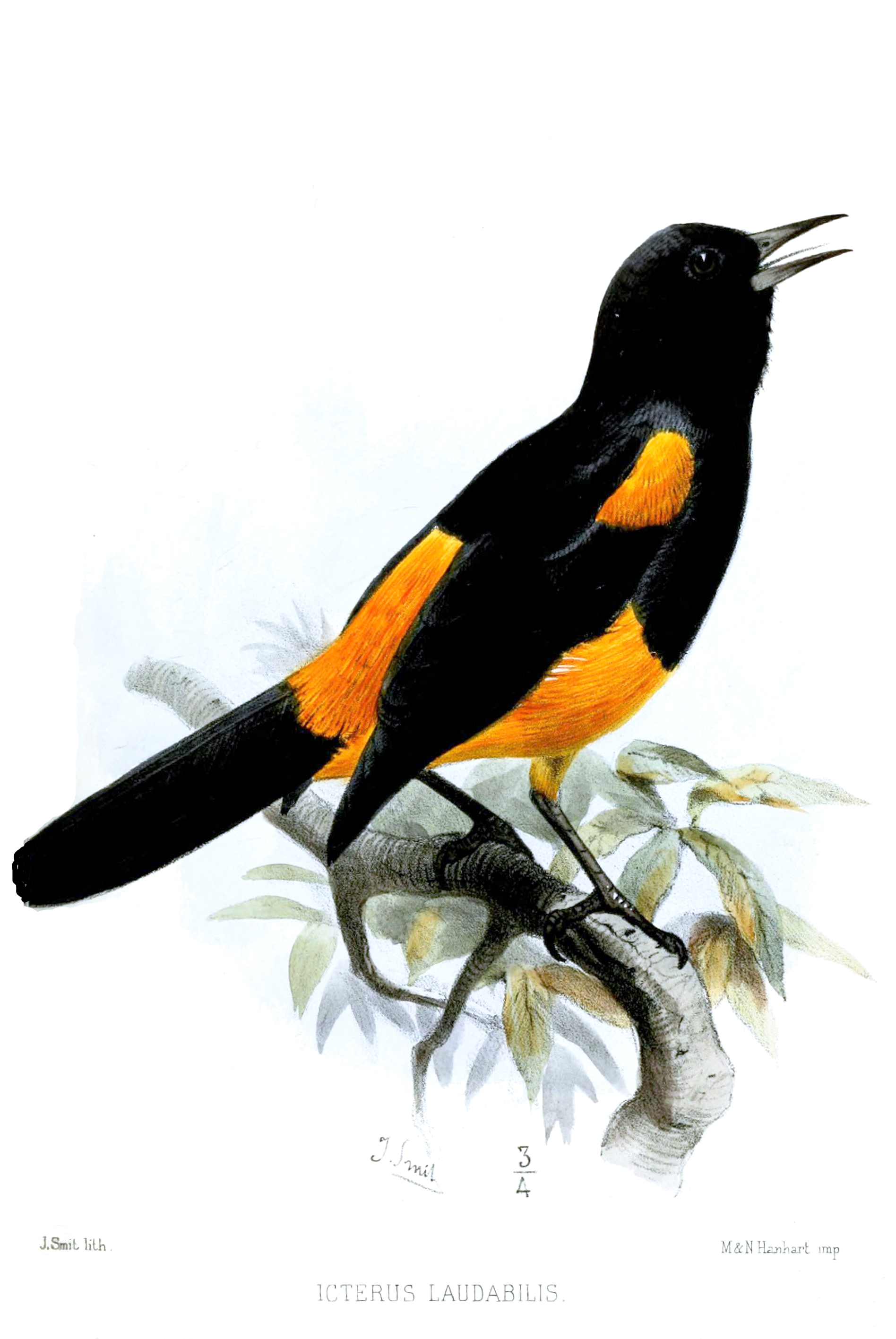

Conservation status
- Endangered (IUCN 3.1)

Scientific classification
- Kingdom: Animalia
- Phylum: Chordata
- Class: Aves
- Order: Passeriformes
- Family: Icteridae
- Genus: Icterus
- Species: I. laudabilis

Binomial name
- Icterus laudabilis Sclater, PL, 1871

= Saint Lucia oriole =

Species of bird

The Saint Lucia oriole (Icterus laudablis) is a species of songbird endemic to Saint Lucia. Locally known as the Corouge, it is in the family Icteridae and the genus Icterus (or New World orioles). Due to human development, this species of Oriole (a long with many others in the Caribbean) has seen significant population decline due to invasive species and habitat loss.

== Geography & Habitat ==
St. Lucia orioles are endemic to, and exclusively found on the main island of St. Lucia located in the Lesser Antilles. The Saint Lucia Oriole does not migrate. They are the only resident orioles on the island, however, Baltimore and Orchard orioles may be found in the region as vagrants.

St. Lucia orioles are known to inhabit mountain rainforests, dry coastal scrub forests, primary and secondary forests, the edges of certain plantations (such as banana citrus and coconut) and mangroves (particularly those that adjoin coastal scrub). They appear to prefer humid mountain forests over the dry coastal scrub forests. The regions which are inhabited by St. Lucia orioles range from sea level up to 700m in elevation.

== Conservation ==
Recently, there has been a decline in both the population size and distribution, as the St. Lucia orioles have become more scarce and localized. In 2022, the IUCN Red List changed their status to “Endangered” with a population estimated at over 1,000 adults (although not drastically over). There are many factors that may pose a threat to the species. Potential hazards include habitat loss, pesticide spraying, and parasitism by Shiny Cowbirds (Molothrus bonariensis). Shiny Cowbirds are increasingly invasive species found in most of the Caribbean and southern Florida. More studies are needed to understand the effects they have on St. Lucia oriole populations.

== Physical description ==
Like many species of Caribbean Orioles, the Saint Lucia Oriole is not sexually dimorphic. These birds are identified as slim, long billed and largely black with flashes of russet orange on the shoulders, rump, belly and vent. The upper ridge of the beak, or culmen, is straight. The adult females are morphologically similar to males but with slightly paler orange patches with more orange yellow. Adults molt once a year after their breeding season. They go through one pre-basic molt which replaces some feathers across the body, wings, and tail.

Immature orioles are mostly chestnut colored and have a golden-olive where the mature orioles are orange. Immature males are like adult males, where the orange replace with a golden olive. Immature females are more chestnut brown on the upperparts of their bodies, with duller colors on their epaulet.

This particular species is roughly 20 to 22 cm in head to body length with an average mass of 36.9 gram (both male and female measurements are included). Males and females have average wingspans of 98.7mm and 94.0mm, respectively.

== Vocalizations ==
The song of the St. Lucia orioles is a series, composed of two second long varied whistles played in a sequence. It is not known whether the species produces different series with unique variations of whistles or merely repeats the same sequence each time. The song is comparable to that of the Orchard Oriole, with one distinction being that it is weaker. Most tropical orioles have both male and female song. However, publications do not indicate whether or not the female of this species sing.

There are also two distinct calls of the St. Lucia orioles. These are a harsh chwee and a soft chup.

== Behavior ==
Typical of the Icterid family, St. Lucia orioles exhibit wide range of foraging adaptations. They feed on both fruits and insects. St. Lucia orioles are often found in pairs foraging in trees. However, small groups (of up to ten individuals) have been observed. They have also been observed stripping oak bark to that of a similar manner to their relatives the Jamaican oriole.

They produce a typical hanging oriole nest, which is basket shaped, and woven from plant fibers. The St. Lucia oriole nests under large fronds of banana plants and in coconut palms. Females lay 2–3 eggs at a time. Males do not feed the female during nesting, but they may aid in provisioning the young. Nesting occurs through April to early June. Between late June – August, juveniles (some being fed by adults) have been observed.
