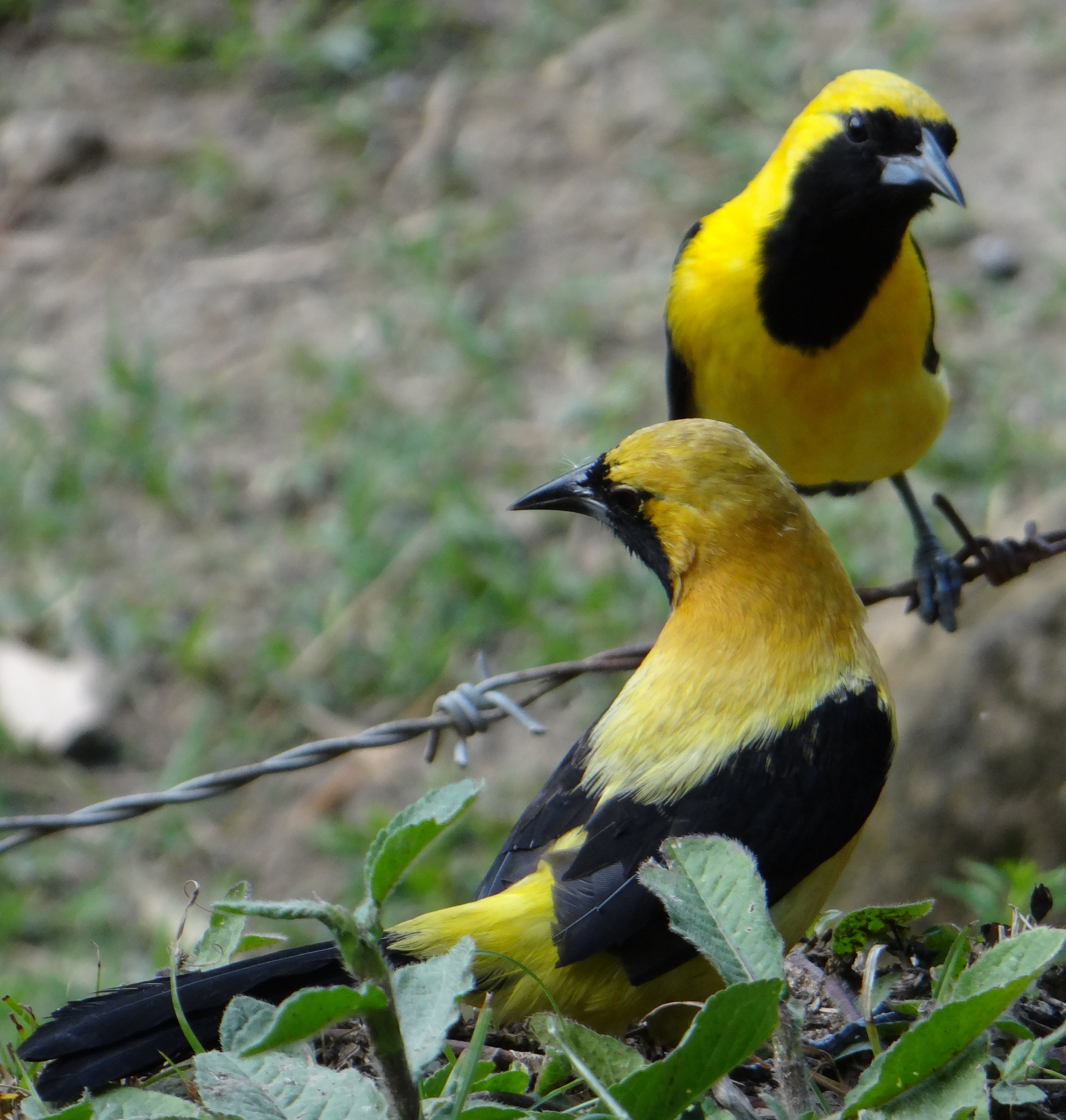

Conservation status
- Least Concern (IUCN 3.1)

Scientific classification
- Kingdom: Animalia
- Phylum: Chordata
- Class: Aves
- Order: Passeriformes
- Family: Icteridae
- Genus: Icterus
- Species: I. chrysater

Binomial name
- Icterus chrysater (Lesson, 1844)
- Range of I. chrysater

= Yellow-backed oriole =

Species of bird

The yellow-backed oriole (Icterus chrysater) is a species of bird in the family Icteridae.

== Description ==
Yellow-backed orioles are a yellow-bodied, sexually monomorphic species. They average 21.5 cm (8.5 in) in length from beak to tail; making it a relatively medium-sized oriole species. Exposed skin and claws are bluish-black; in adults, the bill is black, with the base of the mandible becoming bluish-grey.

Adult males display strongly contrasting yellow and black plumage. The wings, tail, shoulders, throat, and face are all black; by contrast, the back and underparts are an extremely bright yellow. Adult females closely resemble males, but yellow parts appear slightly greenish. Despite differences in plumage coloration between sexes, it is likely that this species is extremely difficult to sex in the field.

Immature yellow-backed orioles resemble adult females in overall pattern, but are greener; additionally, the flight feathers, which are black in females, are dark brown. Immature yellow-backed orioles are easily distinguished from adult females by their olive eye-line.

Similar species include the South American yellow oriole (Icterus nigrogularis).

== Distribution and habitat ==
Yellow-backed orioles are found throughout Central America and northern South America. In particular, the species is divided into three allopatric populations. One population, designated as the subspecies I. c. giraudii, is endemic to southern Central America, including Nicaragua, Panama, and Colombia. The northernmost populations comprise the subspecies I. c. chrysater and I. c. mayanensis; these subspecies are found in northern Central America and in southern Mexico. The species is found in Belize, Colombia, El Salvador, Guatemala, Honduras, Mexico, Nicaragua, Panama, and Venezuela.

Yellow-backed orioles are able to tolerate a wide variety of habitats, but prefer open, mixed pine-oak woodlands and dry scrub forest. This species has also been sighted in banana plantations. It has occasionally colonized lowland deciduous forest.

This species is usually found in regions that are less than 900 m (3,000 ft) in altitude, though in Central and South America populations are often seen residing at elevations greater than 1,000 m (3,300 ft). The upper altitude limit for populations observed in the wild appears to be about 3,000 m (9,800 ft).

== Reproduction ==
Yellow-backed orioles are monogamous; like many species of the genus Icterus, they breed once a year with a single mate.

The nests of this species are shallow, dangling baskets that are usually hung from the edge of a tree limb. Members of this species appear to prefer to attach nests to the tips of palm fronds. Nests are usually woven of fine grasses, giving them a springy texture (Wetmore et al. 1984). Nests of this species are normally hung in the canopy of mature trees that are at least 7 m (23 ft) in height.

The eggs of this species are whitish, with purple scrawlings that are concentrated near the broad end of the egg. The eggs are commonly marked with evenly distributed brown lines.

== Behavior ==
=== Agonistic interactions ===
Yellow-backed orioles have been observed to congregate in small flocks of up to eight individuals; these flocks are probably family units, as they are composed of individuals at varying stages of maturity. This species occasionally joins mixed-species flocks that include band-backed wrens, jays, and other medium-sized orioles.

=== Communication ===
This species has a clear, whistling voice, with a song resembling that of Spot-breasted orioles (Icterus pectoralis). The song generally consists of a series of clear notes, but it acquires a muddy, warbled quality among populations native to southern Central America. Both sexes are known to sing, which appears to be common to orioles that breed in tropical climates. Vocalizations are generally delivered from perches high in trees.

The most commonly used call has been described as a "nasal 'chert'", but other calls include a "whistling chatter" and a "nasal alarm".

== Food habits ==
=== Diet ===
Yellow-backed orioles are insectivorous. Their diet consists primarily of caterpillars, wasps, ants, weevils, and other arthropods. This species' diet is often augmented with bananas and may also include nectar from balsa and Heliconia.

=== Feeding behaviors ===
This species is often observed foraging in family units or in pairs. Insects are hunted by probing the bark of trees or the leaves of epiphytes. While foraging for nectar, this species sometimes practices "nectar robbing", puncturing the base of an unopened flower to gain access to nectar.
