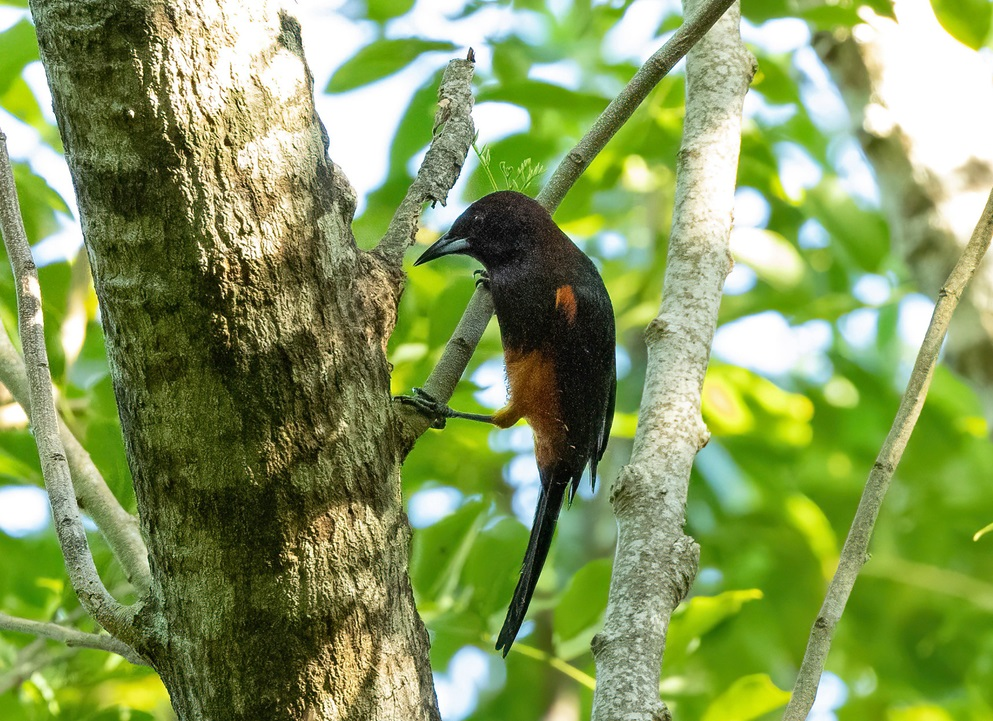

Conservation status
- Vulnerable (IUCN 3.1)

Scientific classification
- Kingdom: Animalia
- Phylum: Chordata
- Class: Aves
- Order: Passeriformes
- Family: Icteridae
- Genus: Icterus
- Species: I. bonana

Binomial name
- Icterus bonana (Linnaeus, 1766)

Synonyms
- Oriolus bonana Linnaeus, 1766

= Martinique oriole =

Species of bird

The Martinique oriole (Icterus bonana) is a species of bird in the family Icteridae. It is endemic to Martinique, French West Indies. Martinique is a part of the Lesser Antilles, and is located in the Eastern Caribbean.

The orioles' habitats are subtropical or tropical dry forests, subtropical or tropical moist lowland forests, subtropical or tropical mangrove forests, and plantations.

== Description ==
Compared to the other orioles of the Lesser Antilles, this oriole spots the most unusual plumage coloration. The Martinique oriole has mainly black plumage with a reddish-orange belly, and grows to 18–21 cm. The males of this species are slightly brighter than the females. It makes harsh scolding calls, and whistles. Whether females sing or not is currently being researched. It eats fruit from the canopy, berries and various insects, foraging alone, in pairs or with a group of family members. Breeding is generally observed between February–July, however breeding has been recorded in December. It is closely related to several other orioles found in the Caribbean.

== Distribution, behavior, and habitat ==
Martinique orioles are found in Martinique, French West Indies. They appear in a density of 2.4 birds/ha in central Martinique. Originally present in many habitat-types below 700 m, the Martinique oriole is now mainly found in mangroves and dry forests. The Martinique oriole generally likes to distance itself from heavily urbanized communities. It places its nest on the underside of wide leaves such as that of a banana plant, palm or Heliconia. Once the nests have been formed, they typically lay two, or sometimes three eggs. Its preferred habitat is in moist highland habitats; however, it could also be found in lowland dry forest habitats. Birds of this species do not form flocks, yet still communicate with each other via whistling, uttering harsh, scolding calls and singing a soft, warbling song. It is a territorial bird, however the territory they control is relatively small, as they have not been seen to feed more than 100 meters from their nest. Much more research is needed on this species.

== Status, threats and conservation ==
Deforestation has led to recent establishment of the shiny cowbird (Molothrus bonariensis) within the Martinique oriole habitat. The shiny cowbird parasites 75% of the oriole nests each year. Another possible threat is from the increase in native Carib grackles (Quiscalus lugubris), the oriole's main predator, which engage in nest-predation of the Martinique oriole.

The Martinique oriole is protected by domestic legislation. The Martinique oriole is listed as vulnerable by the International Union for Conservation of Nature and more research is needed on the threats and population status of the bird for conservative purposes.
