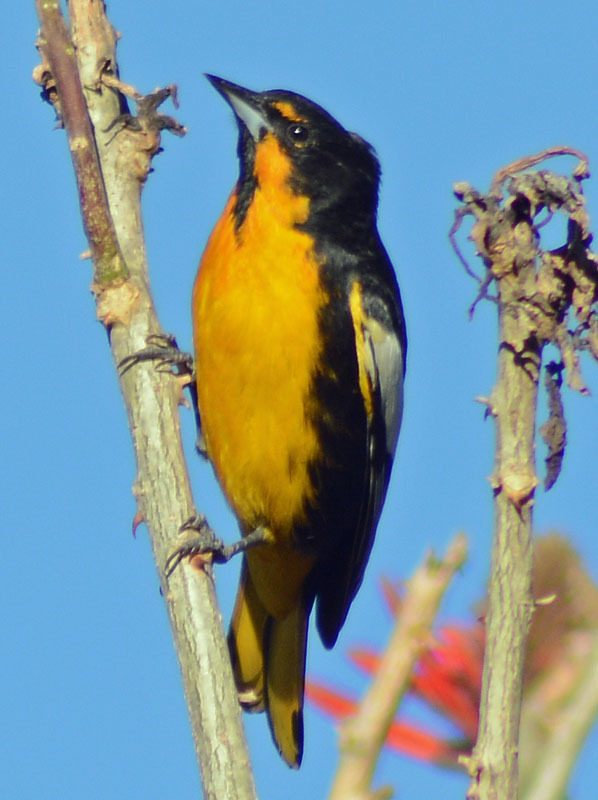

Conservation status
- Least Concern (IUCN 3.1)

Scientific classification
- Kingdom: Animalia
- Phylum: Chordata
- Class: Aves
- Order: Passeriformes
- Family: Icteridae
- Genus: Icterus
- Species: I. abeillei

Binomial name
- Icterus abeillei (Lesson, 1839)

= Black-backed oriole =

Species of bird

The black-backed oriole (Icterus abeillei) is a species of bird in the family Icteridae, the oropendolas, New World orioles, and New World blackbirds. It is endemic to Mexico.

== Taxonomy and systematics ==
The black-backed oriole was formally described in 1839 with the binomial Xanthornis Abeillei (sic). At one time it and what are now Bullock's oriole (I. bullockiorum) and the Baltimore oriole (I. galbula) were treated as conspecific.

The black-backed oriole is monotypic.

== Description ==
The black-backed oriole is 18 to 20.5 cm (7.1 to 8.1 in) long and weighs 31 to 37 g (1.1 to 1.3 oz). Adult males are black on the crown, sides of the head, nape, and upperparts. They have an orange line above the lores, thin orange crescents above and below the eye, and orange cheeks. Their upperwing is mostly black with wide white edges on the flight feathers. The wing's median and greater coverts are white and show as a large patch on the closed wing. Their tail's three outer pairs of feathers are yellow with black tips and the rest are black. They have a black chin that extends in a thin stripe down the throat. The rest of their throat and their underparts are orange-yellow. Their flanks and thighs are black. Adult females are olivaceous gray where males are black, including the wings and tail. Their throat is dull orange with a white middle stripe. Their breast is dull orange and their belly and flanks grayish white. Immature males are like adult females but have the adult's black lores and throat stripe and their underparts approach adults' brightness.

== Distribution and habitat ==
The black-backed oriole is found in central Mexico from Durango east to western Tamaulipas and south to Oaxaca. It breeds in a variety of somewhat open landscapes including open forest, clearings and edges of denser forest, gallery forest, and orchards and gardens. In the non-breeding season it also occurs in montane oak (Quercus), pine (Pinus), and fir (Abies) forest. In elevation it mostly ranges between 1,500 and 3,000 m (4,900 and 9,800 ft) but is found as high as 3,900 m (12,800 ft).

== Behavior ==
=== Movement ===
The black-backed oriole is a partial migrant. It is a year-round resident in the middle of its range in an area roughly bounded by west-central Jalisco, southern Hidalgo, central Puebla, and central Michoacán. It breeds but does not overwinter from that area north to the line Durango – western Tamaulipas. It winters from the southern edge of that area south to northwestern Oaxaca.

=== Feeding ===
The black-backed oriole feeds on insects, spiders, fruit, and nectar. It is a significant predator on the toxic monarch butterfly (Danaus plexippus) on their shared wintering grounds; it has evolved a tolerance to the butterfly's natural poison and in addition feeds mostly on its less toxic internal parts.

=== Breeding ===
The black-backed oriole breeds between April and August. Nothing else is known about the species' breeding biology.

=== Vocalization ===
The black-backed oriole's song is "a rich warble, often with some scratchy notes" that covers a rather wide frequency range. Its calls include a "loud chatter and [a] nasal chay".

== Status ==
The IUCN has assessed the black-backed oriole as being of Least Concern. It has a large range; its estimated population of at least 50,000 mature individuals is believed to be decreasing. No immediate threats have been identified. It occurs in a few protected areas.
