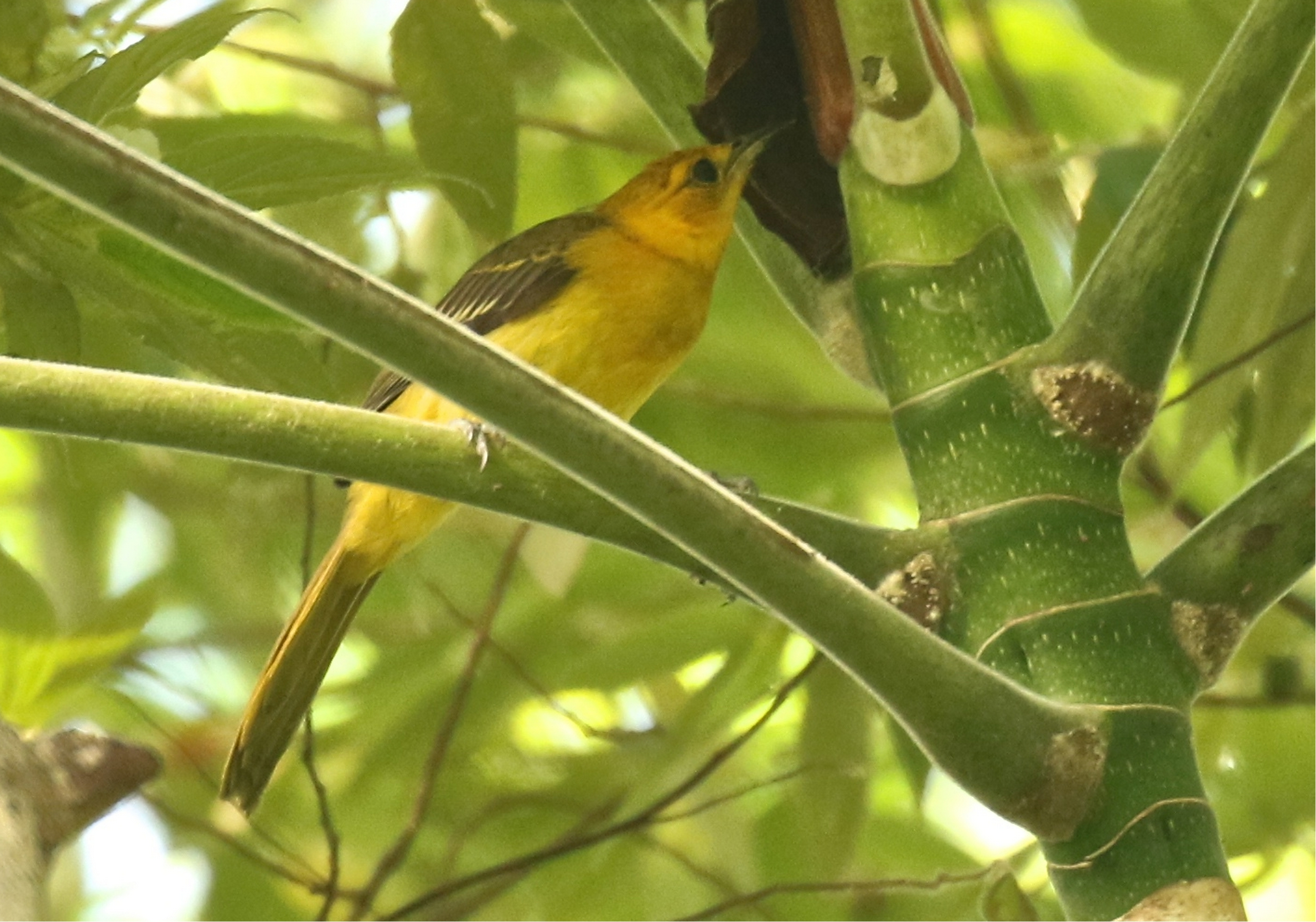

Conservation status
- Least Concern (IUCN 3.1)

Scientific classification
- Kingdom: Animalia
- Phylum: Chordata
- Class: Aves
- Order: Passeriformes
- Family: Icteridae
- Genus: Icterus
- Species: I. auricapillus

Binomial name
- Icterus auricapillus Cassin, 1848

= Orange-crowned oriole =

Species of bird

The orange-crowned oriole (Icterus auricapillus) is a species of bird in the family Icteridae, the oropendolas, New World orioles, and New World blackbirds. It is found in Colombia, Panama, and Venezuela.

== Taxonomy and systematics ==
The orange-crowned oriole was formally described in 1848 with its current binomial Icterus auricapillus. It is monotypic.

== Description ==
The orange-crowned oriole is 18 to 20 cm (7.1 to 7.9 in) long. Males weigh an average of about 33 g (1.2 oz) and females an average of 32 g (1.1 oz). The sexes have the same plumage. Adults have an orange-red crown, nape, and sides of the head. The rest of their face and their throat, breast, mantle, upper back, and tail are black. Their lower back and rump are yellow and their rearmost uppertail coverts are black with thin yellow edges at the end. Their wing is mostly black with yellow lesser and median coverts that show as an epaulet on the closed wing. Their underparts below the black breast are yellow.They have a brown iris, a black bill, and gray legs and feet. Juveniles are paler than adults with a yellow face, olive crown and upperparts, dusky wings and tail, and pale yellow throat and underparts with a greenish wash on the breast.

== Distribution and habitat ==
The orange-crowned oriole is found from eastern Panama's Panamá and Darién provinces east across northern Colombia and northern Venezuela. In Colombia it is found mostly to the north of the approximate line from northern Chocó Department east to Norte de Santander Department but also south to Huila and northern Meta departments. In Venezuela it is found on the western and eastern bases of the Andes and from eastern Falcón east to Sucre and Monagas and from there south into northern Bolívar. It also occurs locally as far east as Delta Amacuro.

The orange-crowned oriole inhabits a variety of semi-open landscapes including the edges of mesic to humid forest, gallery forest, secondary forest, and ranches and farmed areas with trees in the tropical and subtropical zones. Sources differ on its elevational range. One states it is from sea level to 800 m (2,600 ft). A recent one states that it ranges up to 1,900 m (6,200 ft). A Central American field guide takes it to 2,000 m (6,600 ft) in Panama and a Colombian guide to 1,200 m (3,900 ft) in that country. In Venezuela it is found to 1,900 m (6,200 ft) north of the Orinoco River but only to 300 m (1,000 ft) south of it.

== Behavior ==
=== Movement ===
The orange-crowned oriole is a year-round resident.

=== Feeding ===
The orange-crowned oriole feeds on insects, other arthropods, and smaller amounts of fruit and nectar. It usually forages in pairs or family groups, foraging in the forest canopy and sometimes in the company of other orioles.

=== Breeding ===
The orange-crowned oriole's breeding season has not been fully defined but spans April to June in northern Colombia and includes September in eastern Venezuela. Its nest is woven from plant fibers and attached to the underside of a large leaf or palm frond. The clutch is two eggs that are whitish with darker spots. The incubation period, time to fledging, and details of parental care are not known. The shiny cowbird (Molothrus bonariensis) is a brood parasite.

=== Vocalization ===
The orange-crowned oriole's song is "a loud, musical, whistled werr, chéet-your-kurr" and it also makes "a musical but slower, longer, rambling ser[ies]". Its calls are "a burry and complaining wheea" [and a] sharp ze'e't". When foraging it sometimes makes "a loud, clear whistled krEEEa".

== Status ==
The IUCN has assessed the orange-crowned oriole as being of Least Concern. It has a large range; its estimated population of at least 50,000 mature individuals is believed to be stable. No immediate threats have been identified. It is considered common in Panama. It is "fairly common" in Colombia and "uncommon...in low density" in Venezuela.

== Gallery ==
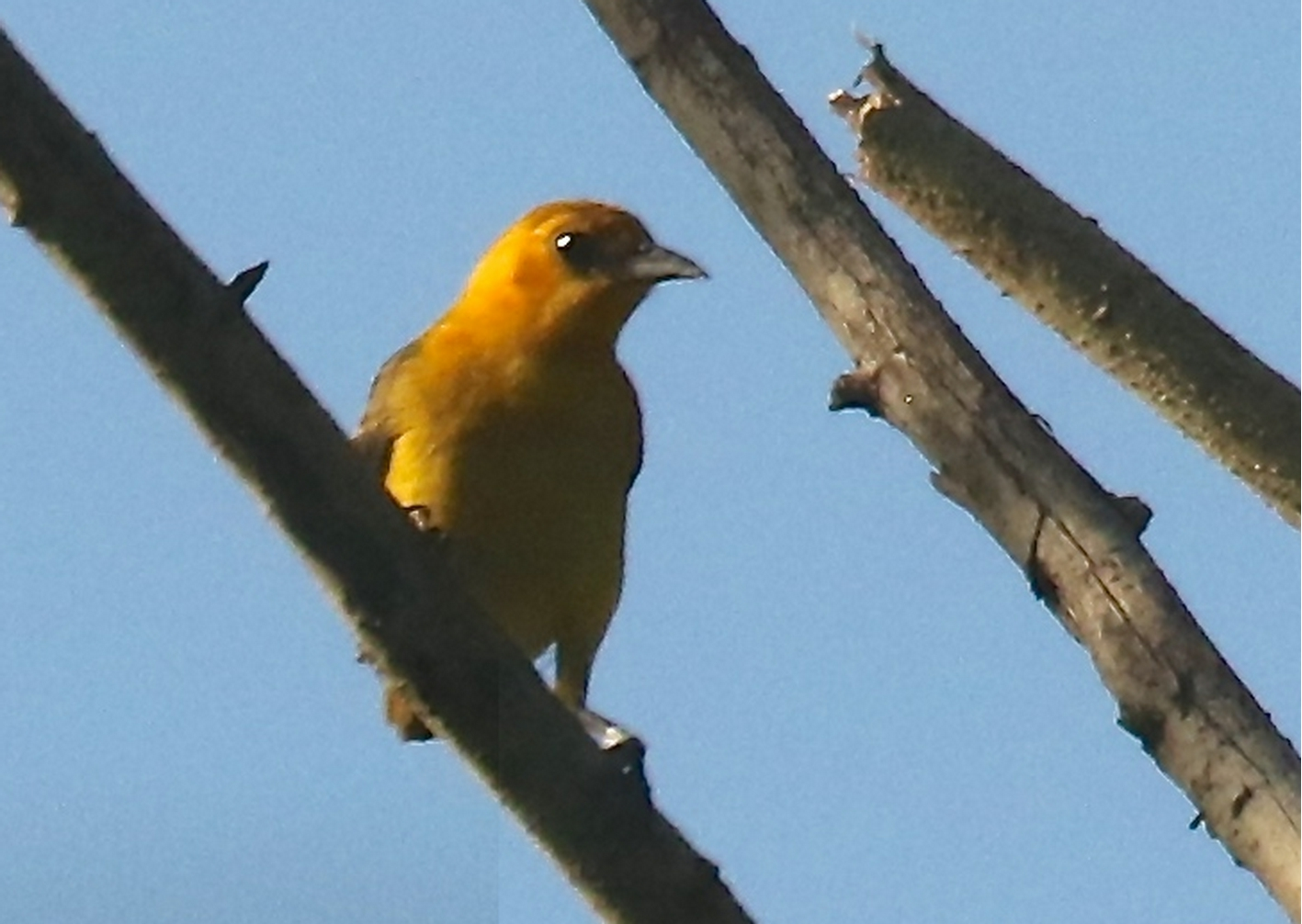
Female or juvenile, Aligandi area, Darien, Panama

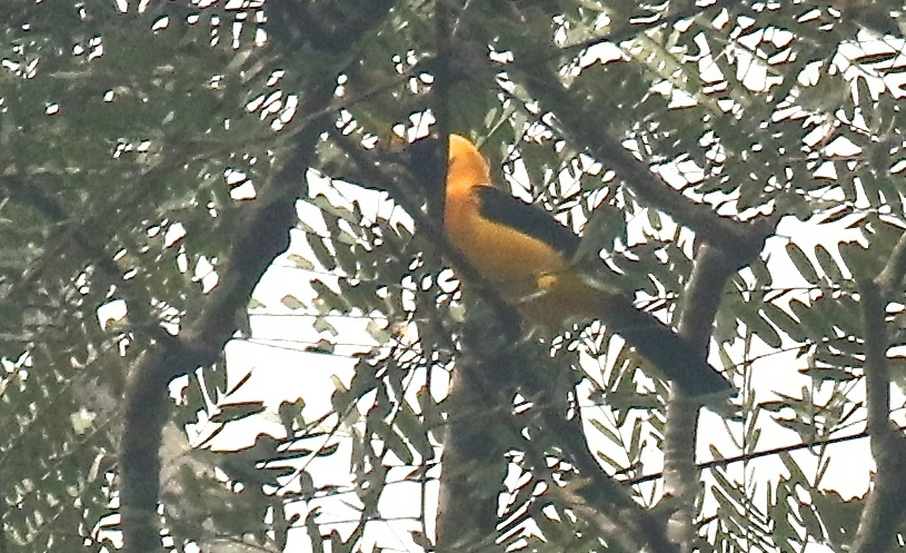
Male, El Salto Rd., Darien, Panama
