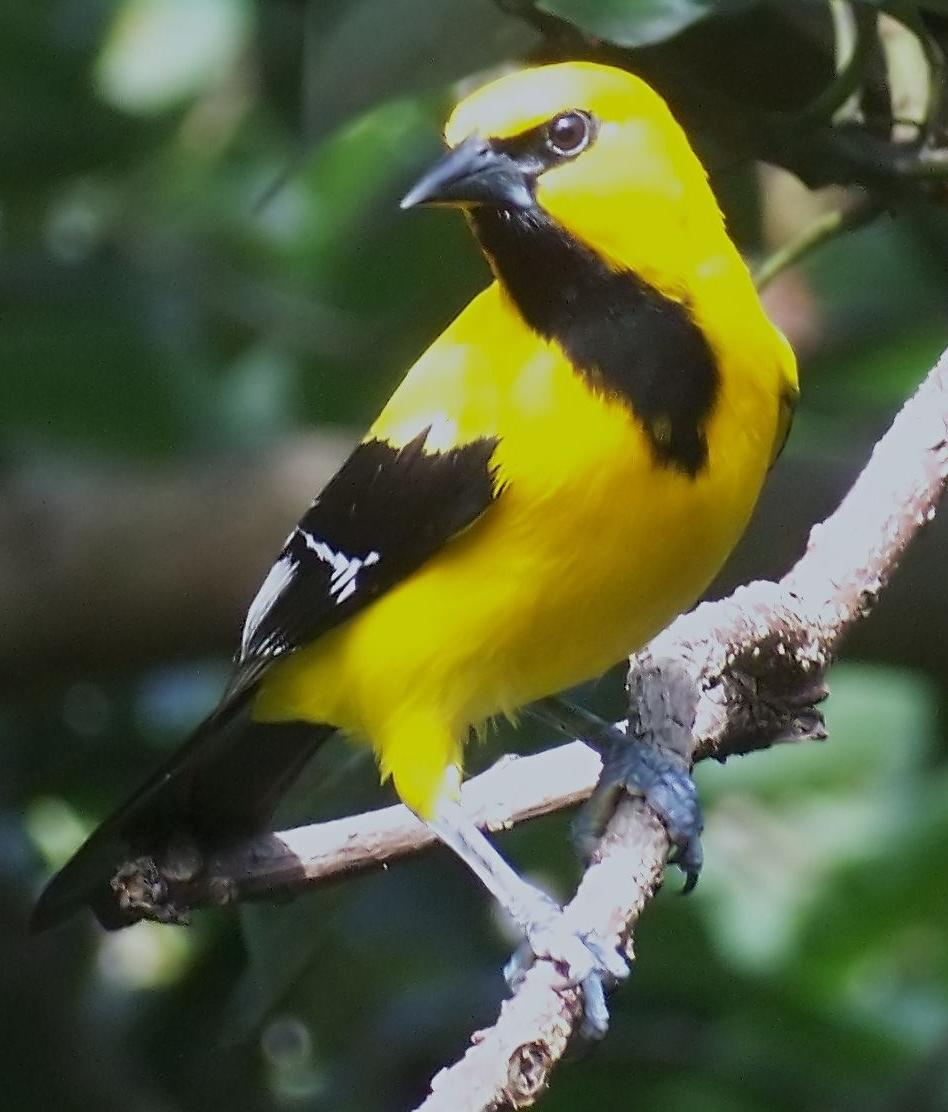

Conservation status
- Least Concern (IUCN 3.1)

Scientific classification
- Kingdom: Animalia
- Phylum: Chordata
- Class: Aves
- Order: Passeriformes
- Family: Icteridae
- Genus: Icterus
- Species: I. nigrogularis

Binomial name
- Icterus nigrogularis (Hahn, 1819)

= Yellow oriole =

Species of bird

The yellow oriole (Icterus nigrogularis) is a passerine bird in the family Icteridae, the oropendolas, New World orioles, and New World blackbirds. It is found in Aruba, Bonaire, Brazil, Colombia, Curaçao, French Guiana, Guyana, Suriname, Trinidad, and Venezuela.

== Taxonomy and systematics ==
The yellow oriole was formally described in 1819 with the binomial Xanthornis nigrogularis. In the years since then it was given the binomials Xanthornus xanthornus, Xanthornus linnaei, Oriolus xanthorus, Agelaius xanthornus, Psarocolius xanthornis, and Icterus xanthornus before is current assignment in Icterus.

The yellow oriole has these four subspecies:

- I. n. nigrogularis (Hahn, 1819)
- I. n. curasoensis Ridgway, 1884
- I. n. helioeides Clark, AH, 1902
- I. n. trinitatis Hartert, EJO, 1913

Subspecies I. n. nigrogularis has the local name "gonzalito" in Venezuela. I. n. trinitatis has the local names "small cornbird" and "plantain bird" on Trinidad.

== Description ==
The yellow oriole is 20 to 21 cm (7.9 to 8.3 in) long and weighs about 38 g (1.3 oz). Adult males of the nominate subspecies I. n. nigrogularis are mostly bright yellow though somewhat paler on the belly. They have black lores, a black "mask", and a black "bib" from the chin to the upper breast. Their wings are mostly black with white edges on the flight feathers, yellow lesser and median coverts, and white tips on the greater coverts, tertials, and primaries. The last show as a white patch on the folded wing. Their tail is black with small white tips on the outer two pairs of feathers. Adult females have a greenish wash on their back but are otherwise like males.

Subspecies I. n. curasoensis is a paler and colder yellow than the nominate. It has a longer, thinner, bill and a much larger white patch on the wing. I. n. helioeides is the largest subspecies and has the thickest bill. It is the brightest yellow of all, with an orange tinge, and has a wider black bib and larger white edges on the flight feathers than the others. I. n. trinitatis is similar to helioeides but smaller and with a shorter bill, and it has the least amount of white on the wings of all subspecies. All subspecies have a dark brown iris, a black bill with a bluish gray base to the mandible, and plumbeous gray to dark bluish gray legs and feet.

== Distribution and habitat ==
The nominate subspecies of the yellow oriole has by far the largest range of the four; it is found across the northern South American mainland. It is found in northern Colombia from the Caribbean south to the Magdalena River's middle reaches and separately in the eastern Colombian departments of Arauca, Casanare, Meta, and Vichada. The eastern Colombian range extends east across northern Venezuela east of the Andes with the exception of the Paria Peninsula. The northern range possibly extends into northwestern Venezuela west of the Andes. From Venezuela its range continues east through the Guianas to the Atlantic in the far northern Brazilian state of Amapá.

Subspecies I. n. curasoensis is found in the ABC Islands of Aruba, Bonaire, and Curaçao. I. n. helioeides is found on Margarita, Coche, and Cubagua islands which together form the Venezuelan state of Nueva Esparta. I. n. trinitatis is found on Trinidad, the Trindadian island of Monos, and the Paria Peninsula and northern Sucre in far northern mainland Venezuela.

The species has been recorded as a vagrant to Grenada.

The yellow oriole inhabits a variety of semi-open to open areas, many of which are dry or arid. These include arid scrublands and thorn scrub with much cactus and leguminous trees, dry deciduous forest, gallery forest, urban and suburban parks and gardens, fruit plantations, and the edges of mangrove. It shuns humid closed forest. In elevation it reaches 300 m (1,000 ft) in Colombia, mostly to 850 m (2,800 ft) but locally as high as 1,800 m (5,900 ft) in Venezuela, and 500 m (1,600 ft) in Brazil.

== Behavior ==
=== Movement ===
The yellow oriole is a year-round resident and is thought to be sedentary.

=== Feeding ===
The yellow oriole feeds primarily on insects and other invertebrates, fruits, and nectar. It captures prey by gleaning, pecking, and probing bark, twigs, and leaves. It eats both wild and cultivated fruits, and takes nectar from flowers and hummingbird feeders. It usually forages singly, in pairs, or in small groups that are thought to be families. It forages from near the ground to the forest canopy.

=== Breeding ===
The yellow oriole's breeding season varies across its range and has been noted in so many months that it is suspected to breed year-round. The nest is a long pouch or bag hung from a tree branch or palm frond; they have also been hung from utility wires. Usually the nests are single, but sometimes two or three are in the same substrate. Both sexes build the nest by weaving plant fibers, and sometimes human-made materials such as plastic, cloth, and string are incorporated. Nests are at the forest edge and often above water and can be as high as 15 m (50 ft) above the ground. The usual clutch size is two or three eggs but up to five have been noted. They are white or bluish white with dark dots and lines. Females alone incubate, for about 15 days, while males defend the nest against predators. The time to fledging is not known. Females brood nestlings and both parents provision them.

=== Vocalization ===
The yellow oriole's song is "a detached [series] of short musical phrases, tur-a-leet, tur-sweet, tuur...tweet, tweet and so on". It's dawn song adds "harsh and high-pitched notes". One call is "a rather sharp ka-chek over and over".

== Status ==
The IUCN has assessed the yellow oriole as being of Least Concern. It has a large range; its population size is not known but is believed to be stable. No immediate threats have been identified. It is considered "local" in Colombia, "common" in Venezuela, and "frequent to uncommon" in Brazil. In Venezuela it is commonly captured for the cage bird trade. It is found in protected areas across it range.
