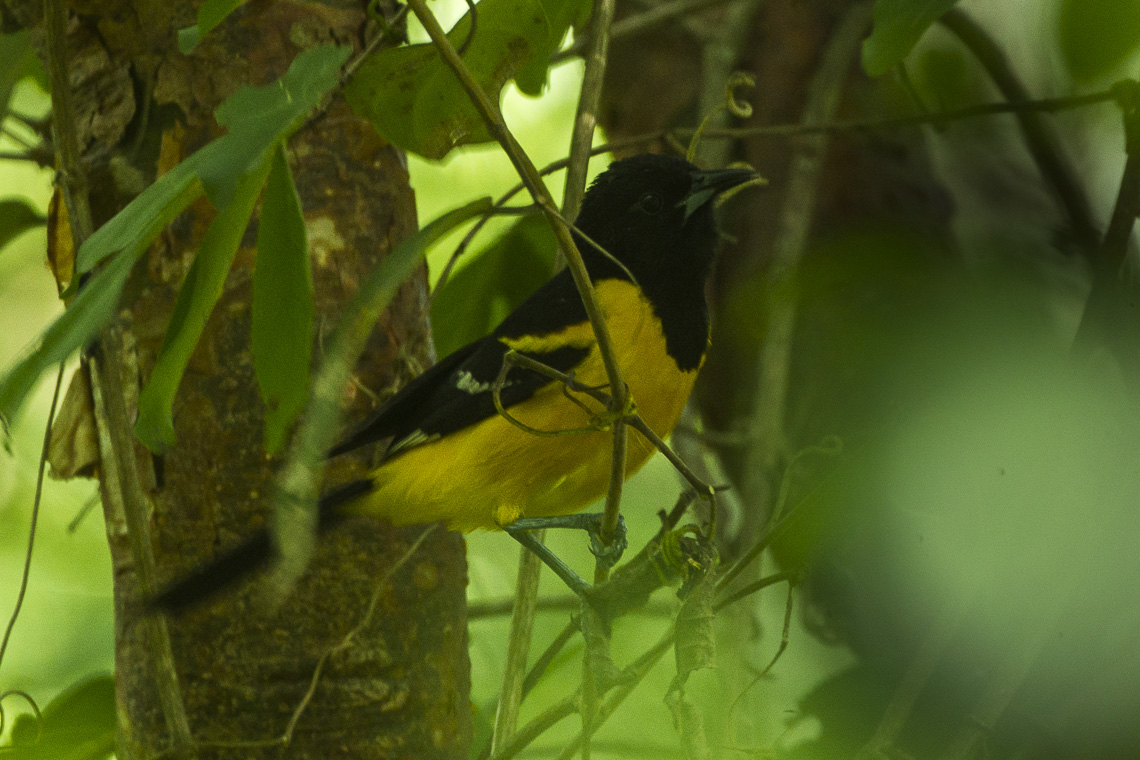

Conservation status
- Least Concern (IUCN 3.1)

Scientific classification
- Kingdom: Animalia
- Phylum: Chordata
- Class: Aves
- Order: Passeriformes
- Family: Icteridae
- Genus: Icterus
- Species: I. maculialatus

Binomial name
- Icterus maculialatus Cassin, 1848

= Bar-winged oriole =

Species of bird

The bar-winged oriole (Icterus maculialatus) is a species of bird in the family Icteridae, the oropendolas, New World orioles, and New World blackbirds. It is found in El Salvador, Guatemala, Honduras, and Mexico.

== Taxonomy and systematics ==
The bar-winged oriole was formally described in 1848 with the binomial Icterus maculi-alatus, which (with modern spelling) remains its binomial.

The bar-winged oriole is monotypic.

== Description ==
The bar-winged oriole is 20.5 to 23 cm (8.1 to 9.1 in) long and weighs 31 to 59 g (1.1 to 2.1 oz). Adult males have a black head, throat, upper breast, back, and tail. Their rump is yellow. Their wing is mostly black with yellow lesser and median coverts and large white tips on the greater coverts. The yellow shows as a patch and the white as a wing bar on the closed wing. Their flight feathers have white edges. Their underparts below the breast are golden-yellow. Adult females have an olive crown, back, rump, and tail. Their wings are mostly olive with yellowish tips on the median coverts and whitish tips on the greater covers. The yellow shows as a thin wing bar and the white as a larger one. Both sexes have a dark brown iris, a black bill with a bluish gray base to the mandible, and bluish gray legs and feet. Juveniles are similar to adult females but browner, with no black on the head, and without wing bars.

== Distribution and habitat ==
The bar-winged oriole is found in the eastern Mexican states of Oaxaca and Chiapas and intermittently south across southern Guatemala into far western Honduras and throughout El Salvador. It inhabits dry oak scrublands and pine-oak forest, semi-deciduous woodlands, and shade coffee plantations. Sources differ on its elevational range. One says it is 500 to 2,100 m (1,600 to 6,900 ft), another 750 to 1,250 m (2,500 to 4,100 ft), and a third 500 to 1,800 m (1,600 to 5,900 ft). A fourth places it between 700 to 1,850 m (2,300 to 6,100 ft) south of Mexico.

== Behavior ==
=== Movement ===
The bar-winged oriole is not a migrant but some local movements that may be in response to availability of flowering trees have been noted.

=== Feeding ===
The bar-winged oriole has been observed feeding in flowering trees but its diet has not been studied. It is assumed to feed on insects, other arthropods, fruit, and nectar. It forages in pairs, family groups, and small flocks that may include other orioles.

=== Breeding ===
The bar-winged oriole's breeding season includes May and June but nothing else is known about the species' breeding biology.

=== Vocalization ===
The bar-winged oriole's song is "a bouncing series of rich, sweet whistles, sa'weet-so'sweet-so'really'sweet-so'saw'weet" and its call "a scratchy, harsh chiiirrrrr".

== Status ==
The IUCN has assessed the bar-winged oriole as being of Least Concern. Its estimated population of between 20,000 and 50,000 mature individuals is believed to be decreasing. No immediate threats have been identified. It is "locally rare to uncommon" overall and uncommon south of Mexico. It is "[p]robably the least known member of the genus".
