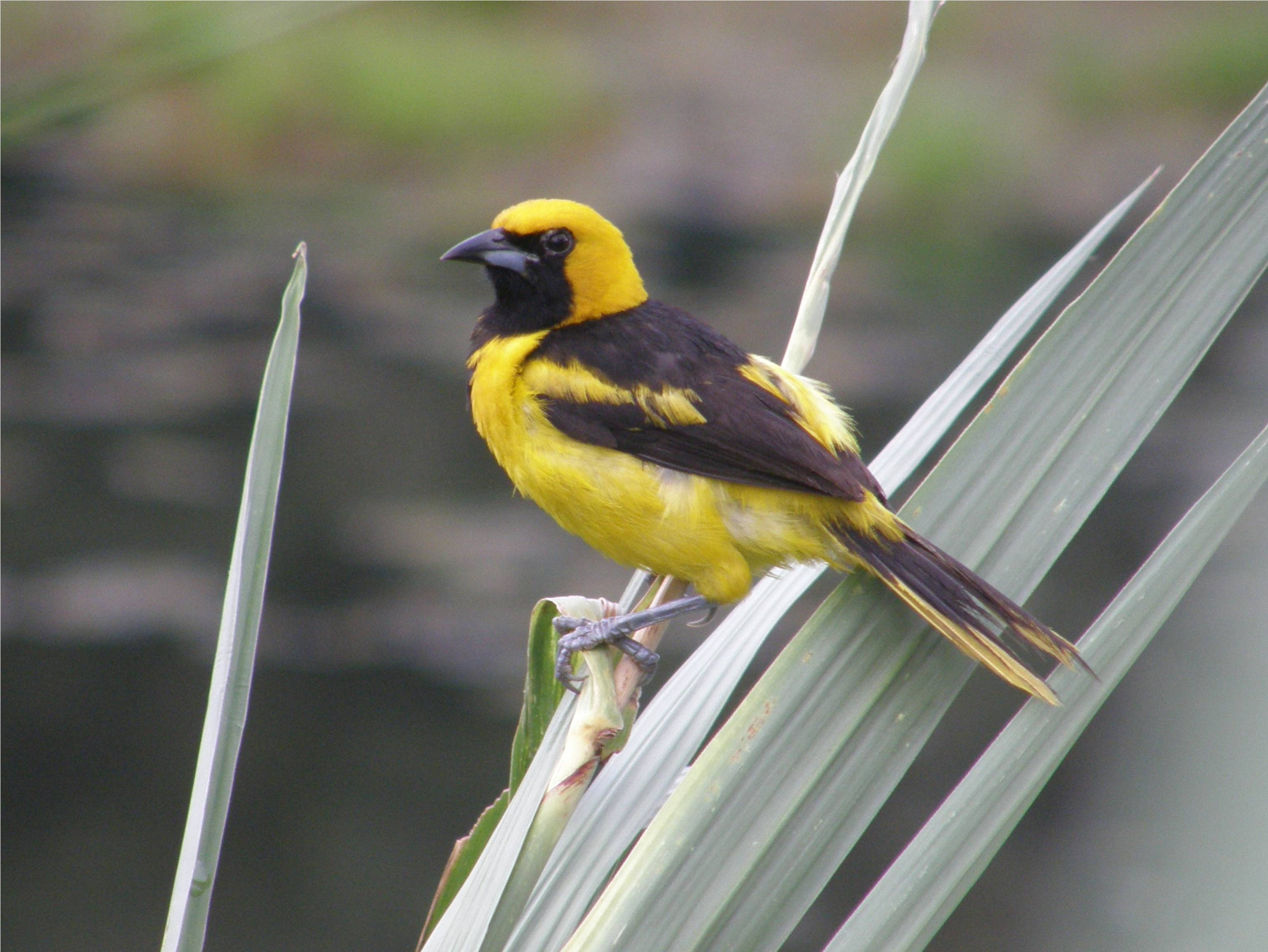

Conservation status
- Least Concern (IUCN 3.1)

Scientific classification
- Kingdom: Animalia
- Phylum: Chordata
- Class: Aves
- Order: Passeriformes
- Family: Icteridae
- Genus: Icterus
- Species: I. mesomelas

Binomial name
- Icterus mesomelas (Wagler, 1829)
- Range of I. mesomelas

Audio

= Yellow-tailed oriole =

Species of bird

The yellow-tailed oriole (Icterus mesomelas) is a passerine bird in the New World family Icteridae. It breeds from southern Mexico to western Peru and northwestern Venezuela; in Peru it also lives in a river valley corridor.

The yellow-tailed oriole is 22–23 cm (8.7–9.1 in) long and weighs 70 g (2.5 oz). It is mainly yellow with a black back, lower face and upper breast. The wings are black with yellow epaulets. The tail, seen from above, is black with yellow margins; from below, it appears almost entirely yellow. This is the only oriole with prominent yellow in the tail, hence the species' name. The sexes are similar, but young birds have the black on the back and tail replaced with olive-green.

There are four subspecies:

- Icterus mesomelas mesomelas – (Wagler, 1829): nominate, found from Mexico to Honduras, has yellow fringes to the tertials
- Icterus mesomelas salvinii – Cassin, 1867: found in the Caribbean lowlands of Nicaragua and Costa Rica, has no yellow fringes to the tertials and is more orange than the nominate race
- Icterus mesomelas carrikeri – Todd, 1917: found in Panama, Colombia and northwestern Venezuela, is like salvinii, but less orange and smaller-billed
- Icterus mesomelas taczanowskiis – Ridgway, 1901: found in Pacific South America from Ecuador to western Peru, has white fringes to the tertials

The calls of this species include a chick and a weechaw. The song is a melodic repetition of rich whistles, chuck, chuck-yeeaow. It is often given as a duet, with the female's response following or overlapping the male's longer phrases.

This large oriole inhabits dense thickets, often with vines, Heliconias and similar dense growths, in swampy lowlands. The birds forage in pairs or small groups in denser vegetation than most orioles, mainly feeding on insects, although they will also take nectar and certain fruits such as gumbo-limbo (Bursera simaruba).

It builds a deep but thin cup nest 2 m (6.6 ft) high in a thorny scrub by a stream. It lays three dark-blotched white eggs, which hatch in 13 days with a further 14 days to fledging.

The yellow-tailed oriole is fairly common except in Peru and Venezuela, but is reducing in numbers in parts of its range because of persecution by the cage-bird trade; this species is valued for both its appearance and its beautiful song.
