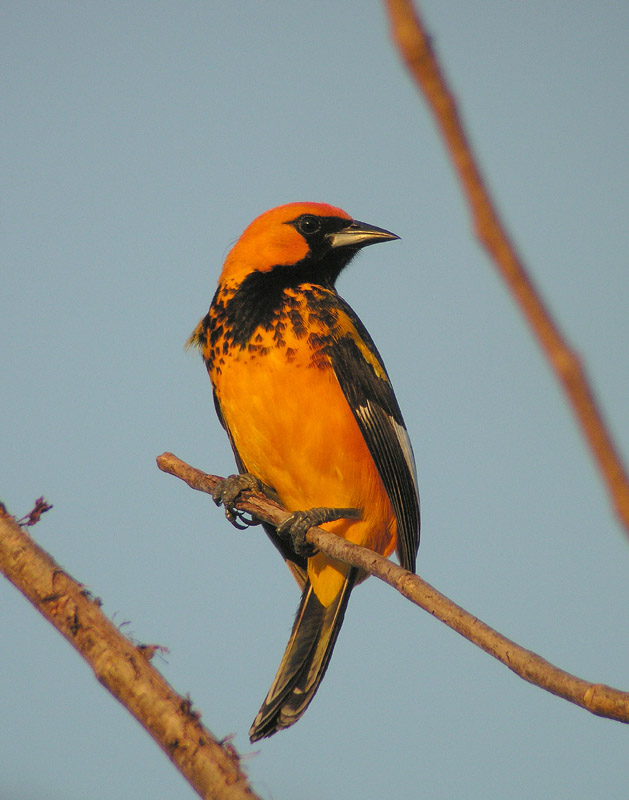
- I. p. espinachi, Costa Rica

Conservation status
- Least Concern (IUCN 3.1)

Scientific classification
- Kingdom: Animalia
- Phylum: Chordata
- Class: Aves
- Order: Passeriformes
- Family: Icteridae
- Genus: Icterus
- Species: I. pectoralis

Binomial name
- Icterus pectoralis (Wagler, 1829)

= Spot-breasted oriole =

Species of bird

The spot-breasted oriole (Icterus pectoralis) is a species of bird in the family Icteridae, the oropendolas, New World orioles, and New World blackbirds. It is found from Mexico to Costa Rica. It also has an introduced population in southern Florida.

== Taxonomy and systematics ==
The spot-breasted oriole was formally described in 1829 with the binomial Psarocolius pectoralis.

The spot-breasted oriole has these four subspecies:

- I. p. carolynae Dickerman, 1981
- I. p. pectoralis (Wagler, 1829)
- I. p. guttulatus Lafresnaye, 1844
- I. p. espinachi Ridgway, 1882

== Description ==
The spot-breasted oriole is about 21 cm (8.3 in) long. Its wing chord is 8.8 to 11.4 cm (3.5 to 4.5 in), its tail 8.5 to 11.2 cm (3.3 to 4.4 in), its culmen 1.9 to 2.4 cm (0.75 to 0.94 in), and its tarsus 2.6–3 cm (1.0–1.2 in). Males weigh an average of about 53 g (1.9 oz) and females about 45 g (1.6 oz). The sexes have the essentially same plumage though females are duller than males. Adults of the nominate subspecies I. p. pectoralis have a mostly deep orange head and nape. They have a black "mask", throat, "bib" on the upper breast, mantle, and back. Their rump is orange. Their wings are mostly black with orange-yellow lesser and median coverts and white edges on the flight feathers; the white shows as a large patch on the closed wing. Their tail is entirely black. Their underparts below the black bib are pale orange with the eponymous black spots on the breast and breast sides. Juveniles are duller and more yellow where adults are orange, with an olive-brown back and no black on the face and breast.

Subspecies I. p. carolynae is mostly like the nominate but its breast spots are larger and usually merge with the bib. I. p. espinachi is more brightly colored than the nominate and I. p. guttulatus has the brightest orange of all. All subspecies have a dark brown iris, a black bill with a gray base to the mandible, and grayish blue legs and feet.

== Distribution and habitat ==
The spot-breasted oriole is mostly a bird of the Pacific slope of Mexico and much of Central America. The subspecies are found thus:

- I. p. carolynae: western Mexico from Jalisco south to Oaxaca
- I. p. pectoralis: southern Mexico in eastern Oaxaca and central Chiapas
- I. p. guttulatus from Chiapas south through southern Guatemala, El Salvador, and Honduras into northwestern Nicaragua. In Honduras it also is on the Caribbean slope.
- I. p. espinachi: from Nicaragua into northwestern Costa Rica's Guanacaste and northern Puntarenas provinces

A population of subspecies I. p. espinachi has been breeding in southeastern Florida since the 1940s and is established in the Miami to West Palm Beach area. Another introduced population of the same subspecies is on Cocos Island about 550 km (340 mi) from the Pacific coast of Costa Rica.

In its native range the spot-breasted oriole primarily inhabits arid woodlands and scrublands with much Acacia, mesquite (Prosopsis), and similar trees. It also is found in lightly treed pastures, ranches, and villages and on the edges of shade coffee plantations. In much of its range it occurs up to 1,500 m (4,900 ft). However, it reaches 1,600 m (5,200 ft) in northern Central America and only 500 m (1,600 ft) in Costa Rica. In Florida it appears to be dependent on introduced shrubs and trees that among them bear flowers and fruit all year.

== Behavior ==
=== Movement ===
The spot-breasted oriole is believed to be a year-round resident.

=== Feeding ===
The spot-breasted oriole feeds primarily on insects and other invertebrates, fruits, and nectar. It captures prey by gleaning and probing foliage. It usually forages in pairs or in small family groups, and in small flocks in the non-breeding season. In its native range it is often seen with other orioles.

=== Breeding ===
The spot-breasted oriole breeds between April and June; some pairs raise two broods in a season. The species is monogamous. Females build the nest "with some help from [the] male". It is a pouch woven from grass, vines, other plant fibers, and fungal rhizomorphs with a lining of finer fibers at its bottom. It typically is hung from a branch of a thorny tree between about 6 and 18 m (20 and 60 ft) above the ground; utility wires have also been used. Often other oriole species nest in the same tree. The usual clutch is three eggs that are bluish white with blackish and lilac markings. The female alone incubates and both parents provision nestlings. The incubation period and time to fledging are not known. The bronzed cowbird (Molothrus aeneus) and giant cowbird (M. oryzivorus) are frequent brood parasites.

=== Vocalization ===
The spot-breasted oriole's song is "a sweet, melodic rising and falling series of repeated clear whistles: eeeep!-weu'peeer-eeeep!-weu'peeer-eeeep!-weu'peeer..." and its calls include "a harsh, scratchy, nasal raannk...and a hoarse chatter".

== Status ==
The IUCN has assessed the spot-breasted oriole as being of Least Concern. It has a large range; its estimated population of at least 500,000 mature individuals is believed to be decreasing. No immediate threats have been identified. It is "locally common" in Mexico. In northern Central America it is fairly common on the Pacific slope and in the interior and "local and spreading" on the Caribbean slope. It is uncommon in Costa Rica. In Florida it "declined sharply after cold winters in the late 1970s and early 1980's" though by the late 1990s its population had somewhat recovered.

== Gallery ==
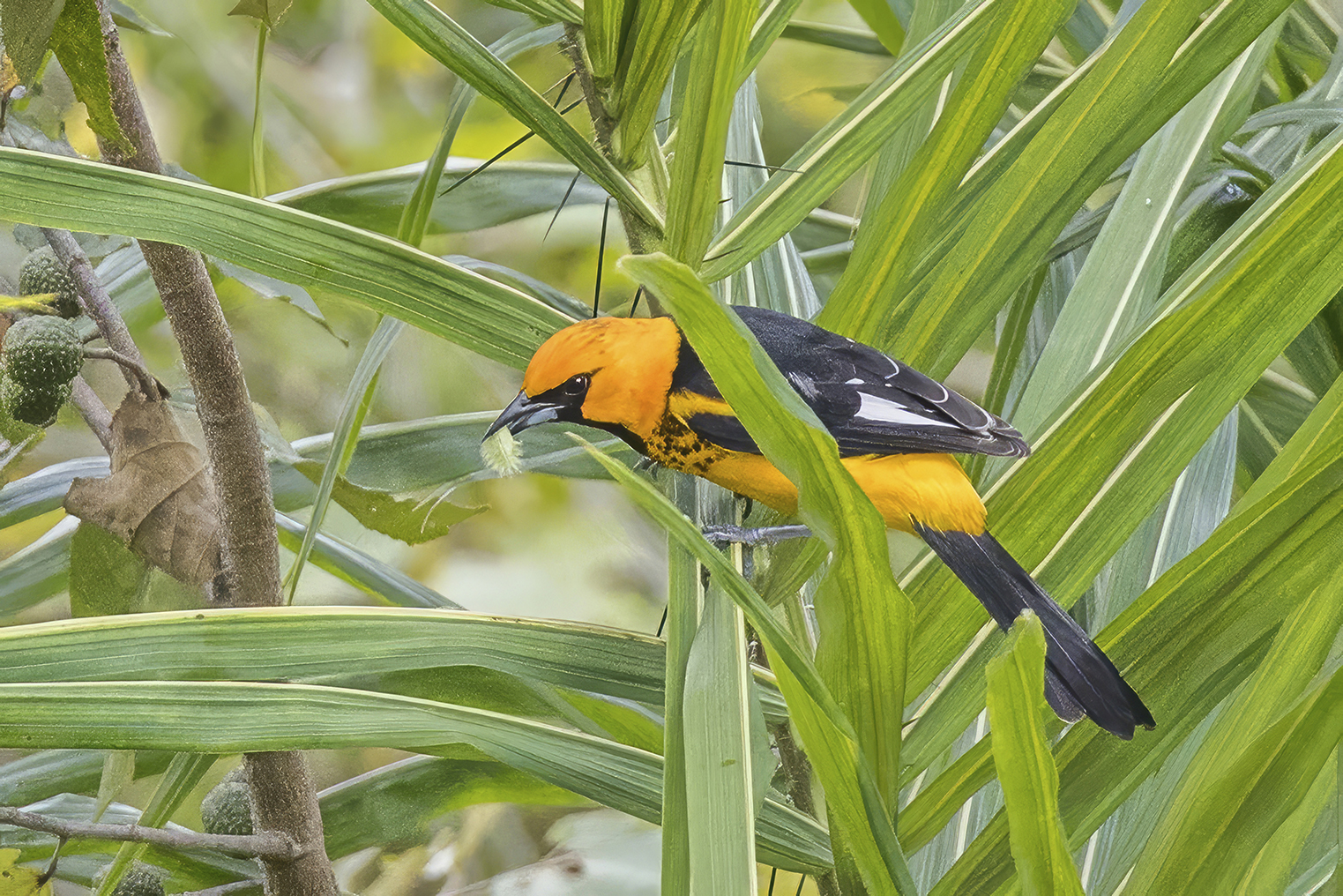
I. p. pectoralis, Honduras

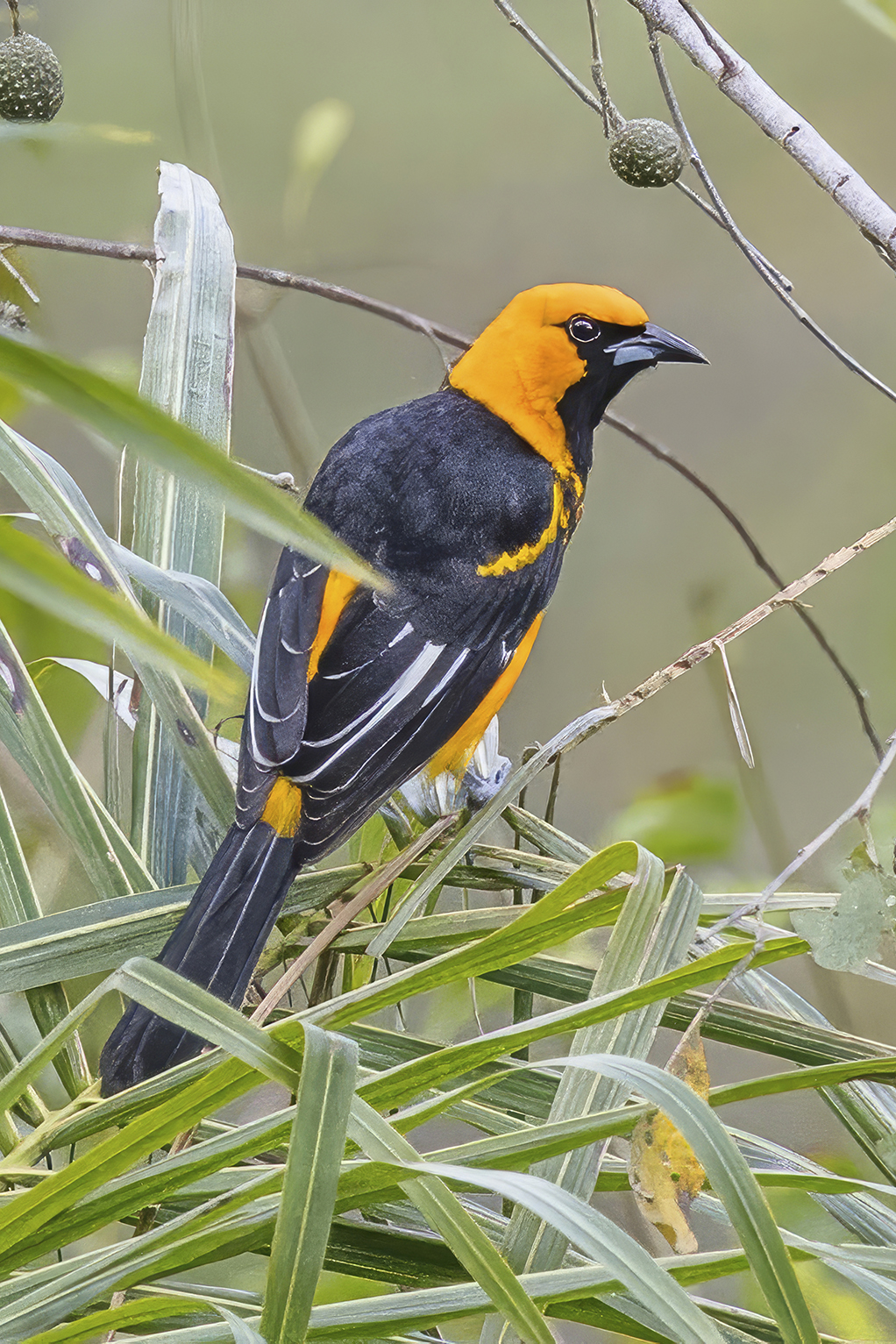
I. p. pectoralis, Honduras
