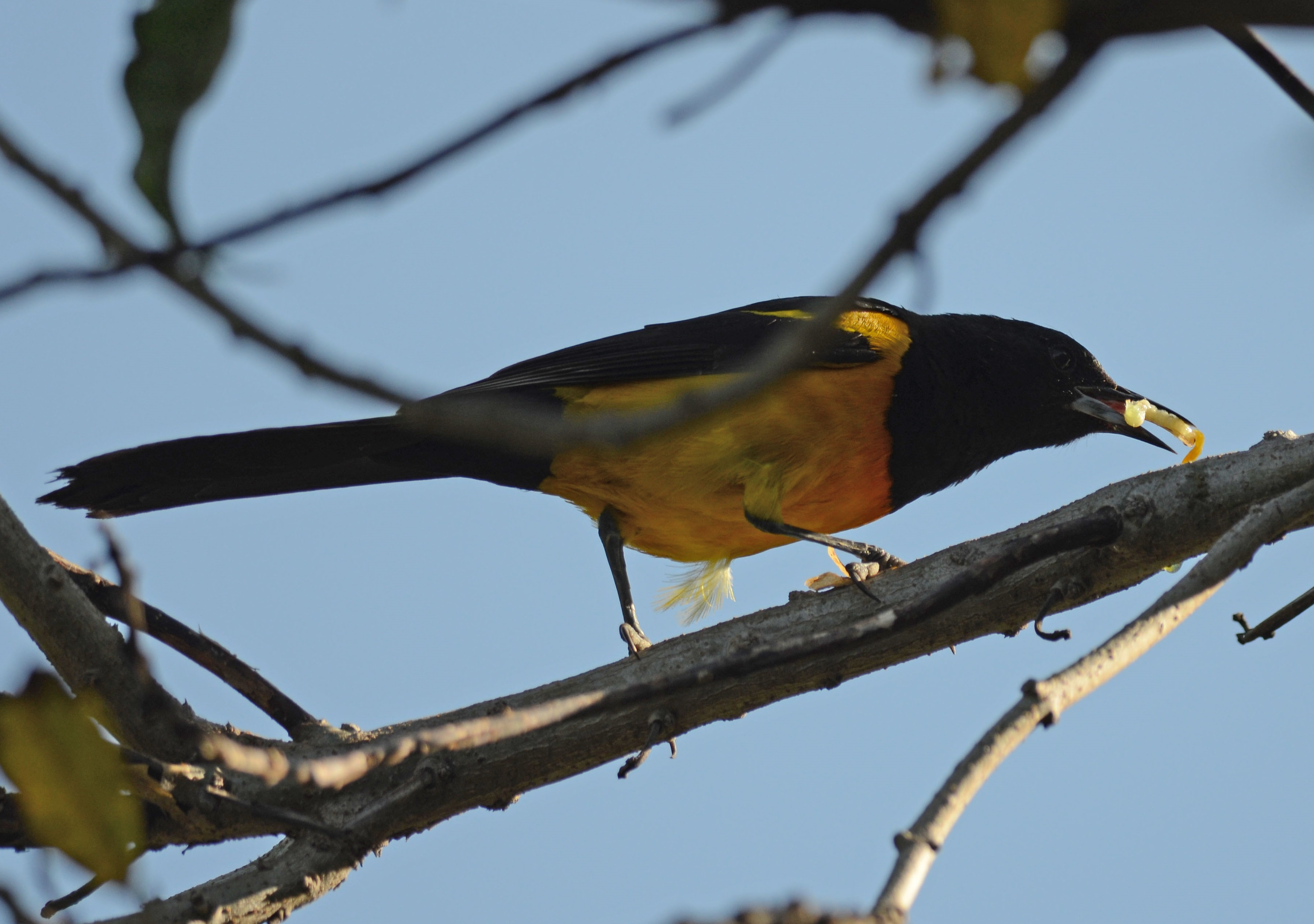

Conservation status
- Least Concern (IUCN 3.1)

Scientific classification
- Kingdom: Animalia
- Phylum: Chordata
- Class: Aves
- Order: Passeriformes
- Family: Icteridae
- Genus: Icterus
- Species: I. wagleri

Binomial name
- Icterus wagleri Sclater, PL, 1857
- Range of I. wagleri

= Black-vented oriole =

Species of bird

The black-vented oriole (Icterus wagleri) is a species of bird in the family Icteridae, the oropendolas, New World orioles, and New World blackbirds.. It is found in El Salvador, Guatemala, Honduras, Mexico, and Nicaragua and has reached the United States as a vagrant.

== Taxonomy and systematics ==
The black-vented oriole was formally described in 1857 with the binomial Icterus wagleri, which it has retained ever since.

The black-vented oriole has two subspecies, the nominate I. w. wagleri (Sclater, PL, 1857) and I. w. castaneopectus (Brewster, 1888).

== Description ==
The black-vented oriole is 20.5 to 23 cm (8.1 to 9.1 in) long. Males weigh an average of about 41 g (1.4 oz) and females an average of 39 g (1.4 oz). Adult males of the nominate subspecies have a black head, throat, upper breast, mantle, back, rump, uppertail coverts, and tail. Their lowermost belly and undertail coverts are also black. Their wing is mostly black with orange-yellow lesser and median coverts that show as an epaulet on the closed wing. Their underparts have a tinge of chestnut just below the black breast and are otherwise orange-yellow. Adult females are duller overall than males and generally more yellow than orange-yellow to the undertail coverts. Subspecies I. w. castaneopectus has more chestnut below the black breast but is otherwise like the nominate. Both sexes of both subspecies have a brown iris, a black bill with a bluish gray base to the mandible, and bluish gray legs and feet. Juveniles are duller than adults with an olive-buff crown and upperparts, some yellow on the face, and buff tips on the median and greater upperwing coverts.

== Distribution and habitat ==
The black-vented oriole has a disjunct distribution. Subspecies I. w. castaneopectus is the more northerly of the two. It is found in Sonora, Sinaloa, and western Chihuahua in northwestern Mexico. The nominate subspecies is found from Durango, Coahuila and Nuevo León in north-central Mexico south through central Guatemala, the northern tip of El Salvador, and southern Honduras into western Nicaragua. However, the nominate's range has a gap at the Isthmus of Tehuantepec in southern Mexico. The species has also wandered to Arizona and Texas in the U. S.

The black-vented oriole inhabits dry scrublands, pine-oak forest, semi-deciduous and deciduous forest, and gallery forest in the upper tropical and lower temperate zones. Sources differ on its elevational range. One says it is 100 to 2,500 m (330 to 8,200 ft) and two others 500 to 2,500 m (1,600 to 8,200 ft). A third places it between 500 and 2,200 m (1,600 and 7,200 ft) south of Mexico.

== Behavior ==
=== Movement ===
The black-vented oriole is not a migrant but makes some elevational movements and also some local ones in response to availability of flowering trees.

=== Feeding ===
The black-vented oriole feeds on insects, other arthropods, fruit, and nectar. It forages in pairs and family groups. It forages in the forest's mid- to upper levels.

=== Breeding ===
The black-vented oriole's breeding season spans at least May to July. It is a solitary breeder and thought to be monogamous. Its nest is a shallow "hammock" woven from plant fibers and typically hung from a tree branch but sometimes from the underside of a palm or banana leaf. The clutch is three to four eggs that are creamy white with dark brown and yellowish markings. The incubation period and time to fledging are not known individually but combined span about 34 days. The bronzed cowbird (Molothrus aeneus) is a brood parasite.

=== Vocalization ===
The black-vented oriole has a rather unmusical song that is "a mix of fast warbles with twittering and nasal or rasping notes". Its call is "a distinctive nasal eeeaahnk!".

== Status ==
The IUCN has assessed the black-vented oriole as being of Least Concern. It has a very large range; its estimated population of at least 500,000 mature individuals is believed to be decreasing. No immediate threats have been identified. It is considered "common to fairly common" in most of its range and "fairly common" south of Mexico.
