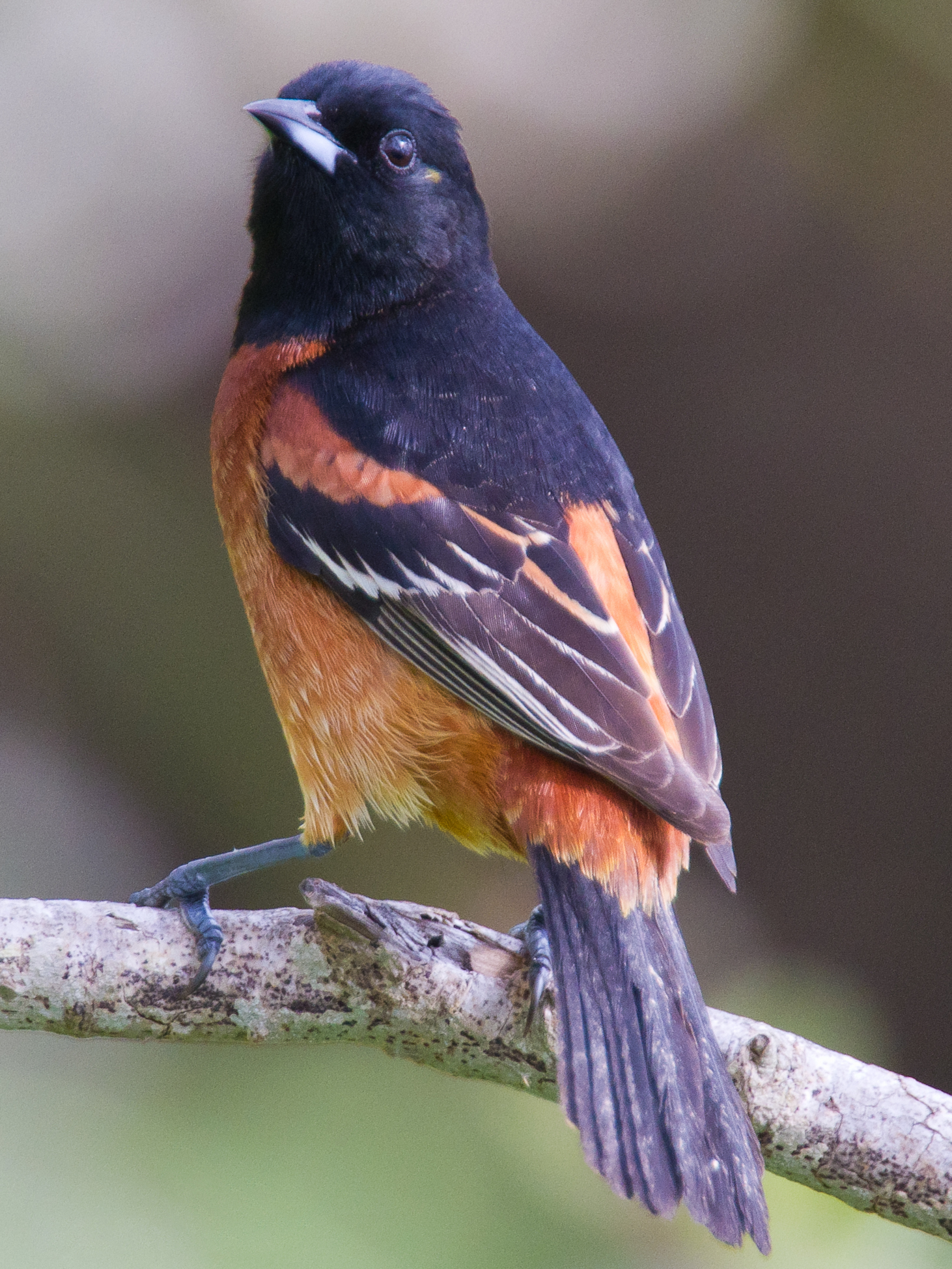
- Adult male I. s. spurius

Conservation status
- Least Concern (IUCN 3.1)

Scientific classification
- Kingdom: Animalia
- Phylum: Chordata
- Class: Aves
- Order: Passeriformes
- Family: Icteridae
- Genus: Icterus
- Species: I. spurius

Binomial name
- Icterus spurius (Linnaeus, 1766)
- Range of I. spurius Breeding range Wintering range

Synonyms
- Oriolus spurius Linnaeus, 1766

Audio

= Orchard oriole =

Species of bird

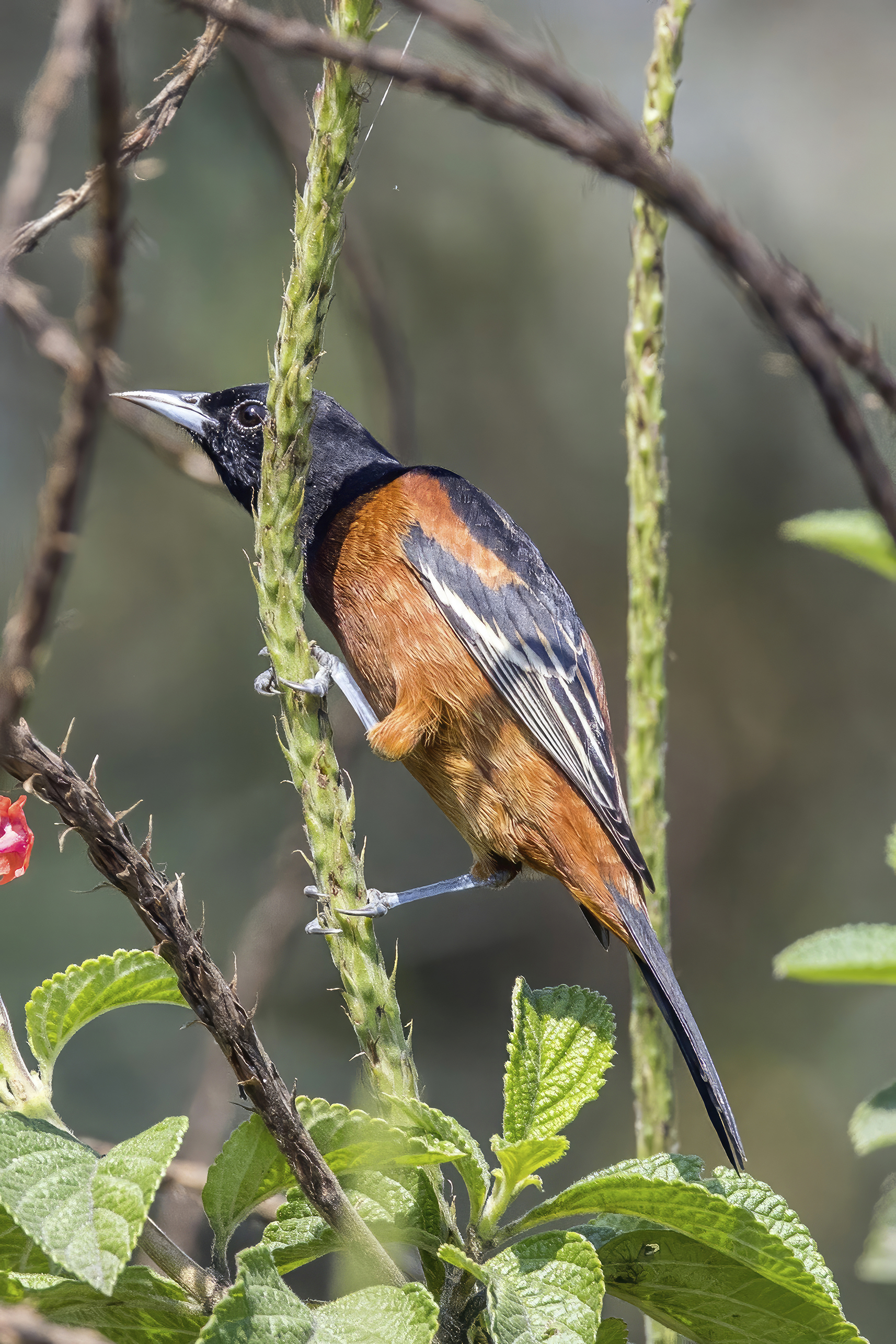
male, Guatemala

The orchard oriole (Icterus spurius) is the smallest species of icterid. The subspecies of the Caribbean coast of Mexico, I. s. fuertesi, is sometimes considered a separate species, the ochre oriole or Fuertes's oriole.

The orchard oriole is a small bird with a length of 5.9-7.1 inches, a weight of 0.6-1.0 ounces, and a wingspan of 9.8 inches. Adult males have chestnut or ochre underparts, while adult females and juveniles have olive-green upper parts and yellowish breasts and bellies. They inhabit semi-open areas with deciduous trees in eastern North America, southern Tamaulipas, and Veracruz. Their winter range extends from central Sinaloa and southern Veracruz to northern Colombia and northwestern Venezuela.

Orchard orioles prefer living near lakes and streams, nesting in tightly woven pouches attached to horizontal tree branches. They are nocturnal migrants and feed on insects, spiders, fruit, nectar, and seeds depending on the season. During flight, they usually swoop close to the ground and fly at or below treetop level. Courtship displays include bowing, seesawing, and begging. The species name "spurius" refers to their original misidentification as female Baltimore orioles, and they are sometimes mistaken for New World warblers.

== Description ==
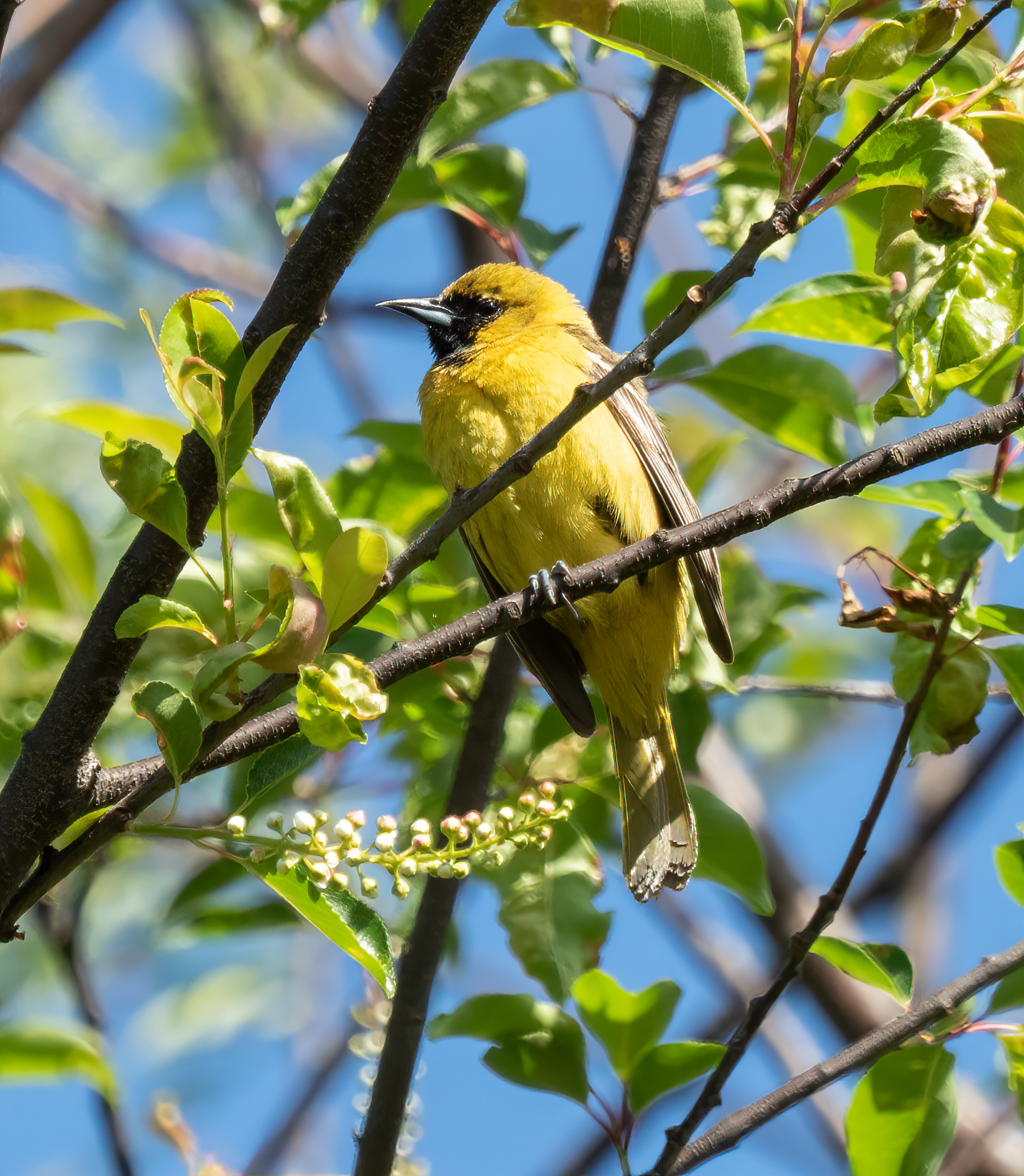
First-year male in New York City

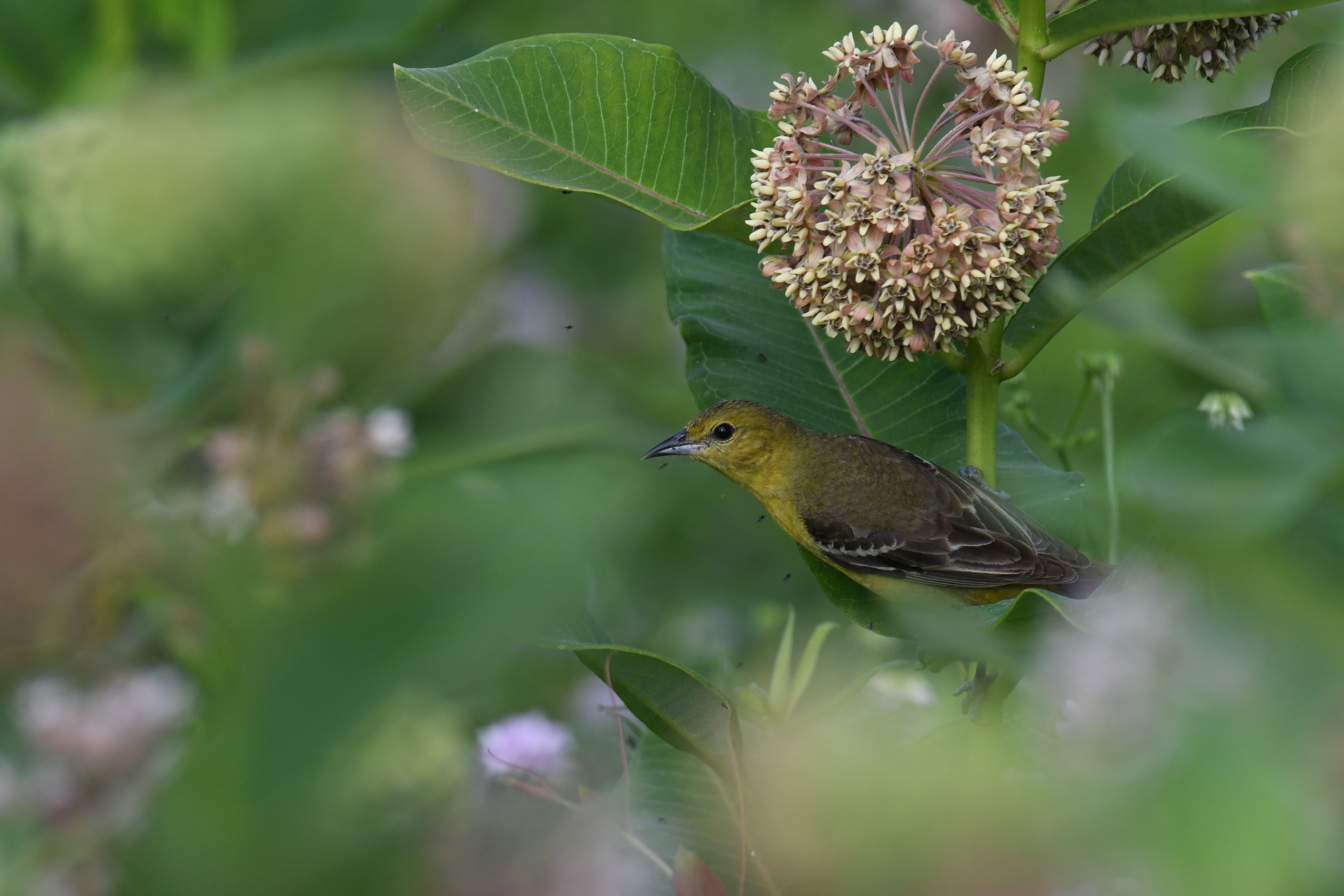
Female on milkweed plant, Delaware

Measurements:

- Length: 5.9–7.1 in (15–18 cm)
- Weight: 0.6–1.0 oz (16–28 g)
- Wingspan: 9.8 in (25 cm)

The bill is pointed and black with some blue-gray at the base of the lower mandible. The adult male of the nominate subspecies has chestnut on the underparts, shoulder, and rump, with the rest of the plumage black. In the subspecies I. s. fuertesi, the chestnut is replaced with ochre. The adult female and the juvenile of both subspecies have olive-green on the upper parts and yellowish on the breast and belly. All adults have pointed bills and white wing bars. (Orchard orioles are considered to be adults after their second year.) One-year-old males are yellow-greenish with black lores and bib.

== Habitat and range ==
The breeding habitat is semi-open areas with deciduous trees. I. s. spurius breeds in spring across eastern North America from near the Canada–United States border south to central Mexico. A 2009 study also found breeding in the thorn forest of Baja California Sur and the coast of Sinaloa during the summer "monsoon"; this region had previously been thought to be only a migratory stopover. I. s. fuertesi breeds from southern Tamaulipas to Veracruz. There is a record of a specimen of fuertesi from Cameron County, Texas. These birds prefer living in shaded trees within parks along lakes and streams. The nest is a tightly woven pouch attached to a fork on a horizontal branch. Their nests tend to sit close together.

The nominate subspecies' winter range extends from the coastal lowlands of central Sinaloa and southern Veracruz south to northern Colombia and northwestern Venezuela (Scharf and Kren 1996). The ochre subspecies has been observed in winter on the Pacific slope of Mexico.

Nominate orchard orioles depart from their winter habitats in March and April and arrive in their breeding habitats from late April to late May. Usually, they leave their breeding territories in late July and early August and arrive on their winter territories in mid August. These birds are nocturnal migrants.

== Diet ==
While in breeding season, they eat insects and spiders. When the season changes, their diet also includes ripe fruit, which quickly passes through their digestive tract. During the winter, their diet consists of fruit, nectar, insects and seeds.

== Behavior ==
When in flight, orchard orioles generally swoop close to the ground and fly at or below treetop level.

During courtship, females display themselves in three ways. The first is by bowing their head and torso toward the male. Seesawing, the second courtship display, involves repetitively alternating lowering and raising the head and tail. The third display is begging, which is fast-paced fluttering of wings halfway extended, followed by a high whistle.

== Etymology ==
The specific name spurius refers to the original misidentification of the male as a female Baltimore oriole. These birds are sometimes mistakenly identified as New World warblers.
