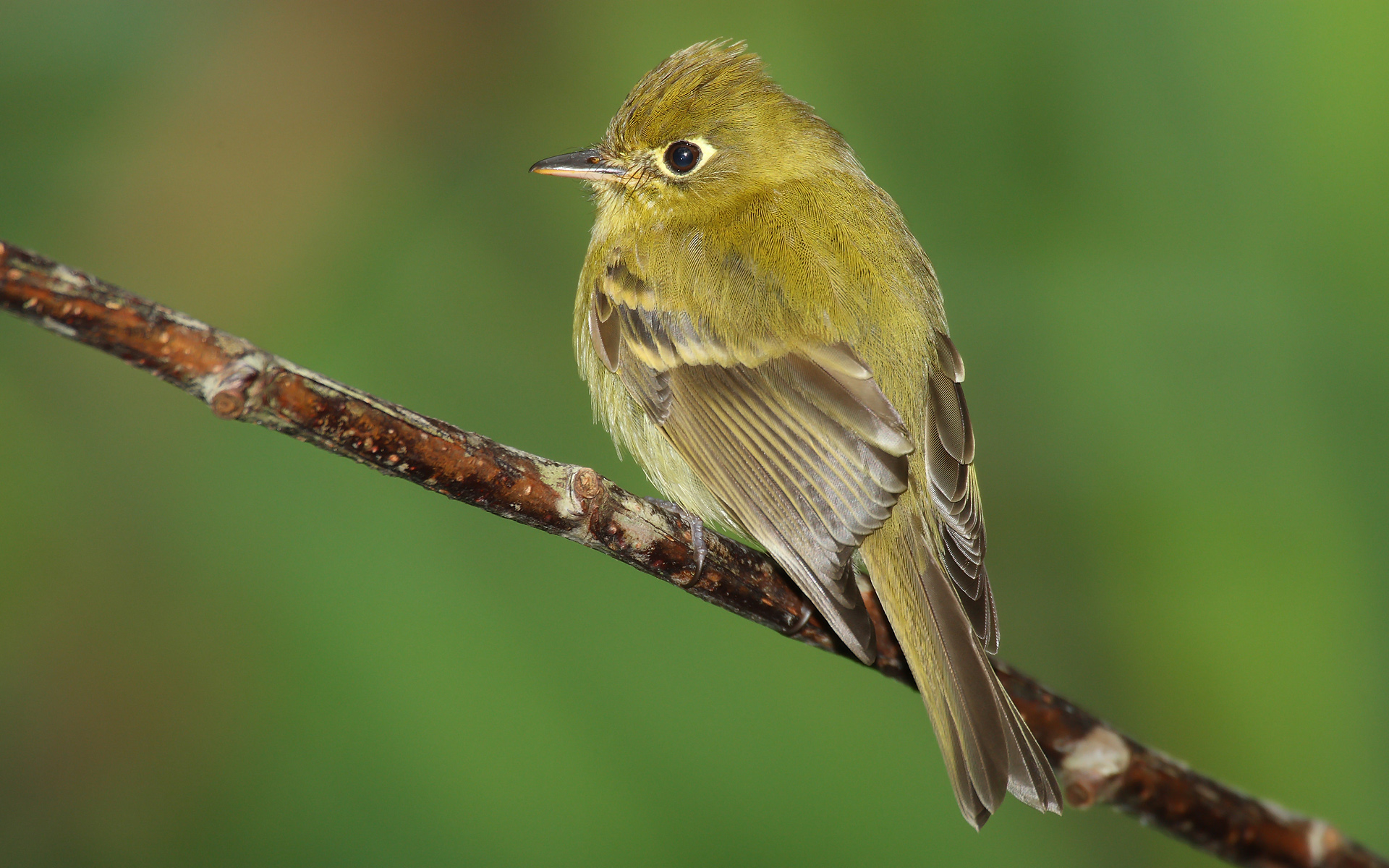
- Side view
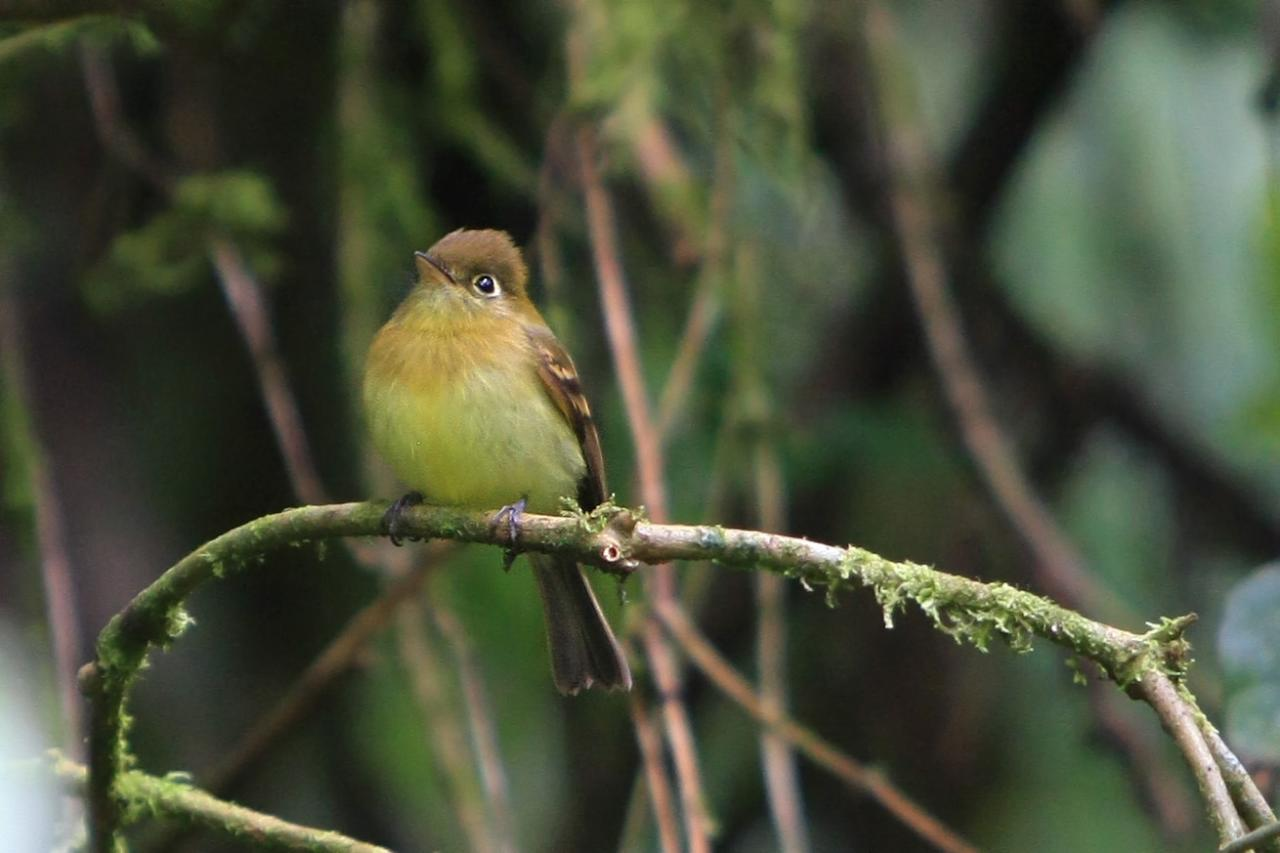
- Front view

Conservation status
- Least Concern (IUCN 3.1)

Scientific classification
- Kingdom: Animalia
- Phylum: Chordata
- Class: Aves
- Order: Passeriformes
- Family: Tyrannidae
- Genus: Empidonax
- Species: E. flavescens

Binomial name
- Empidonax flavescens Lawrence, 1865

= Yellowish flycatcher =

Species of bird

The yellowish flycatcher (Empidonax flavescens) is a small passerine bird in the family Tyrannidae, the tyrant flycatchers. It is found from Mexico to Panama.

== Taxonomy and systematics ==
The yellowish flycatcher has three subspecies, the nominate E. f. flavescens (Lawrence, 1865), E. f. imperturbatus (Wetmore, 1942), and E. f. salvini (Ridgway, 1886).

From the late 1800s to the 1980s the yellowish flycatcher was treated as conspecific with what was then (and is now again) the western flycatcher (E. difficilis). Subspecies E. f. salvini was originally described as a full species and some authors have suggested that it again be treated that way.

== Description ==
The yellowish flycatcher is 12.5 to 14 cm (4.9 to 5.5 in) long and weighs 9 to 16 g (0.32 to 0.56 oz). The sexes are alike. Adults of the nominate subspecies have a pale yellow almond-shaped eye-ring on an otherwise yellowish green face. Their crown, nape, and upperparts are olive-green. Their tail is dusky to blackish with yellowish green edges on the feathers. Their remiges are mostly dusky to blackish and glossy. Their primaries have pale olive edges and the secondaries and tertials have pale yellow edges to the outer webs. The wing coverts are grayish brown with wide yellow tips that show as two wing bars. Their chin and throat are yellowish white, their breast deep yellow, and the rest of their underparts yellowish with hidden white to yellowish white tufts on the flanks. The colors, especially on feather tips, fade with wear. Subspecies E. f. imperturbatus has duller and less yellowish green upperparts than the nominate, with paler colored edges to the flight and tail feathers, a grayer throat, breast, and flanks, and a more yellowish belly. E. f. salvini is larger than the nominate and has greener (less yellowish) upperparts, a greenish olive breast, and a duller yellow belly. All subspecies have a dark brown iris, a black maxilla, a pale pink to orange-yellow mandible, and light brown, dusky brown, or blackish legs and feet.

The yellowish flycatcher is similar to several other members of genus Empidonax. It is most similar to the pine flycatcher (E. affinis), with which it shares some habitat within their common range, but is brighter and greener and readily separated by voice. It is also similar to the migratory yellow-bellied flycatcher (E. flaviventris), which is present in its range in winter, but the yellowish flycatcher ironically has a yellower belly. They too have different voices.

== Distribution and habitat ==
The yellowish flycatcher has a disjunct distribution. Subspecies E. f. imperturbatus has the most limited range. It is found in the Sierra de los Tuxtlas of coastal Veracruz in southeastern Mexico. Subspecies E. f. salvini is found from southern Mexico's Chiapas state south intermittently through Guatemala, El Salvador, and Honduras into northern Nicaragua. The nominate subspecies is found through central Costa Rica into western Panama as far as Veraguas Province.

The yellowish flycatcher inhabits highlands in the subtropical and temperate zones. It primarily occurs in humid evergreen broadleaf forest heavy with moss, lichen, and bromeliads, for example cloudforest. It also occurs in pine and pine-oak forest. It favors the forest understory and is partial to areas near running water. It mostly occurs in the forest interior but also on its edges and in human-modified landscapes such as coffee and cacao plantations, pastures with scattered trees, and gardens. In the Sierra de los Tuxtlas it occurs mostly between 900 and 1,660 m (3,000 and 5,400 ft) but has been seen as low as 100 m (300 ft). The other Mexican population, in Chiapas, ranges between 1,200 and 2,400 m (3,900 and 7,900 ft). In Guatemala, El Salvador, and Honduras it ranges between 650 and 3,000 m (2,100 and 9,800 ft) but mostly occurs above 1,400 m (4,600 ft). In Nicaragua it occurs between 800 and 1,800 m (2,600 and 5,900 ft), in Costa Rica between 800 and 2,500 m (2,600 and 8,200 ft), and in Panama between 1,050 and 2,225 m (3,400 and 7,300 ft).

== Behavior ==
=== Movement ===
The yellowish flycatcher is essentially non-migratory, but some small seasonal elevational changes have been observed.

=== Feeding ===
The yellowish flycatcher feeds primarily on arthropods and also includes small amounts of fruit in its diet. During the breeding season it typically forages in pairs, and singly outside that season. It forages mostly from the forest's mid-story to its canopy but will descend to the understory and the ground. It captures prey in mid-air with sallies from it ("hawking"), by gleaning from vegetation and branches while perched, and from bare ground and grass. It has been observed following army ant swarms to capture prey fleeing the ants. It occasionally joins mixed-species feeding flocks. After a sally it usually lands on a different perch than the one it left from, and quivers the wings and tail when it lands.

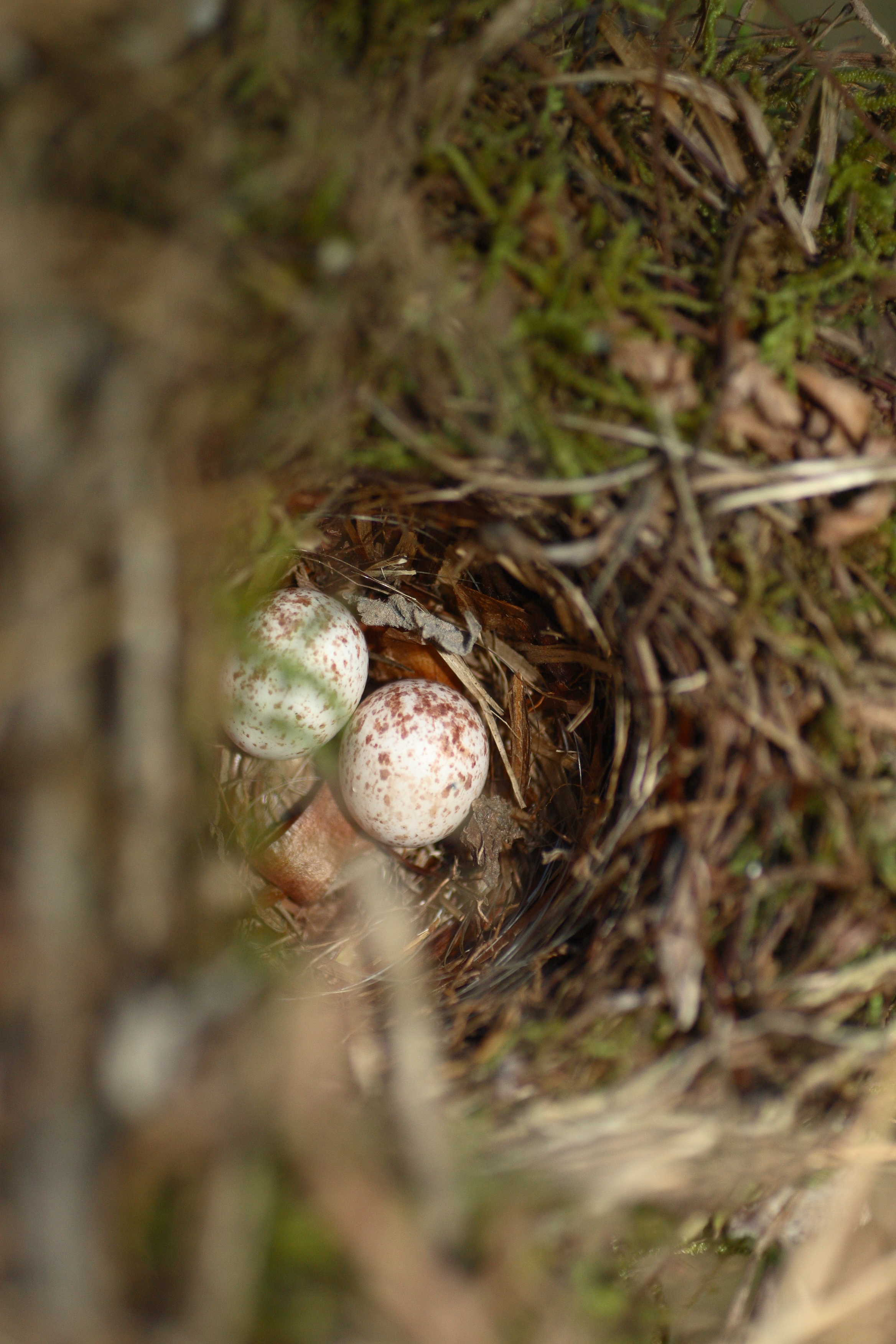
Yellowish flycatcher eggs and nest along a small creek near Providencia, Costa Rica

=== Breeding ===
The yellowish flycatcher breeds between January and August with most activity from mid-March to June. There is some evidence that the species may extend the principal season with a second or replacement brood. The female alone builds the nest. It is an open cup made mostly from green moss and liverwort lined with fine fibers such as horsehair, dried grass, or papery bark. The nest is built on a wide variety of substrates including cliffs, earthen banks, tree cavities, atop bromeliads, and even on ledges on human structures. In nature nests have been observed up to about 3.2 m (10 ft) above the ground or running water. The usual clutch is three eggs but clutches of two are known in about 1/3 of cases. The eggs are whitish with rufous spots on the larger end. The female alone incubates, in Costa Rica for 16 to 17 days. The time to fledging is not known for certain but appears to be about 15 or 16 days. The female alone broods nestlings but both parents provision them. No brood parasitism has been observed but the species has accepted artificial eggs of the bronzed cowbird (Molothrus aeneus). No nest predation has been observed but males are known to chase away other bird species that are known egg predators.

=== Vocalization ===
The yellowish flycatcher's dawn song is "a series of three high-frequency notes [that] sounds like seee chit seee or seee seee chit [and sometimes] seee seee seee". Its calls include a very high "upslurred whistle, seee", a "loud, underslurred, and short note, tseeep", and "a louder tsick or tseet".

== Status ==
The IUCN has assessed the yellowish flycatcher as being of Least Concern. It has a very large range; its estimated population of at least 50,000 mature individuals is believed to be decreasing. No immediate threats have been identified. It is considered common in northern Central America and Costa Rica. It "is potentially threatened by habitat loss and degradation because it inhabits montane forests, which are threatened by their conversion to pasture and various forms of agriculture".
