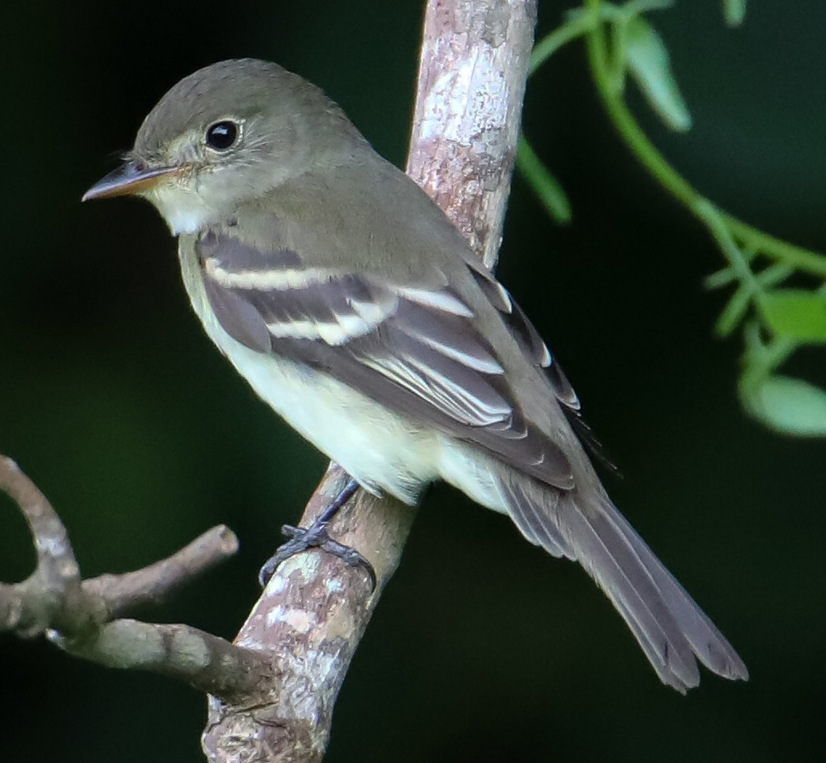

Conservation status
- Least Concern (IUCN 3.1)

Scientific classification
- Kingdom: Animalia
- Phylum: Chordata
- Class: Aves
- Order: Passeriformes
- Family: Tyrannidae
- Genus: Empidonax
- Species: E. virescens

Binomial name
- Empidonax virescens (Vieillot, 1818)
- Breeding Migration Nonbreeding

Synonyms
- Platyrhynchos virescens Vieillot, 1818

Audio

= Acadian flycatcher =

Species of bird

The Acadian flycatcher (Empidonax virescens) is a small insect-eating bird of the tyrant flycatcher family.

== Description ==
Adults have olive upperparts, darker on the wings and tail, with whitish underparts; they have a white eye ring, white wing bars and a wide bill. The breast is washed with olive. The upper part of the bill is dark; the lower part is yellowish. This bird's song is an explosive peet-sa. The call is a soft peet. They also have a call similar to that of the northern flicker. A unique two-note song described as "ka-zeep" helps to identify this species.

Measurements:

- Length: 5.5–5.9 inches (14–15 cm)
- Weight: 0.4–0.5 ounces (11–14 g)
- Wingspan: 8.7–9.1 inches (22–23 cm)

== Taxonomy ==
Originally described in 1810 by ornithologist Alexander Wilson, its first scientific name was Muscicapa querula. The Acadian flycatcher is the only member of its clade within Empidonax, but is most closely related to willow and alder flycatchers.

Because of the similar appearance of the Empidonax flycatchers, the Acadian flycatcher owes its name to a misidentified type specimen for the species, taken in the historic Acadia region of Nova Scotia. Despite its common name, the Acadian flycatcher does not have a native range in Nova Scotia or historic Acadia.

== Distribution ==
Its breeding habitat is deciduous forests, often near water, across the eastern United States and southwestern Ontario. These birds migrate through eastern Mexico and the Caribbean to southern Central America and the very northwest of South America in Colombia, western Venezuela, and Ecuador.

The numbers of these birds have declined somewhat in the southern parts of their range. Brown-headed cowbirds lay eggs in the nests of these birds in some areas. However, only 16% of cowbird young in Acadian flycatcher nests fledge successfully.

They wait on a perch in the middle of a tree and fly out to catch insects in flight (hawking), also sometimes picking insects from foliage while hovering (gleaning). They may eat some berries and seeds.

They make a loose, shallow nest in a horizontal forks of trees and shrubs, primarily in lowland forests and marshy areas.

The Acadian flycatcher is well known for its advanced aerial maneuverability. The bird is quick and direct with its movements, capable of hovering and flying backwards for short durations. The bird does not hop or walk enough to have significant information on those forms of movement.

As of October 2015 there have been 2 records of Acadian flycatcher in Europe, the first being a bird found dead in Iceland in 1967, and the second a bird found on the beach at Dungeness in Kent, England in September 2015, the latter's identity being established by DNA from its droppings.
