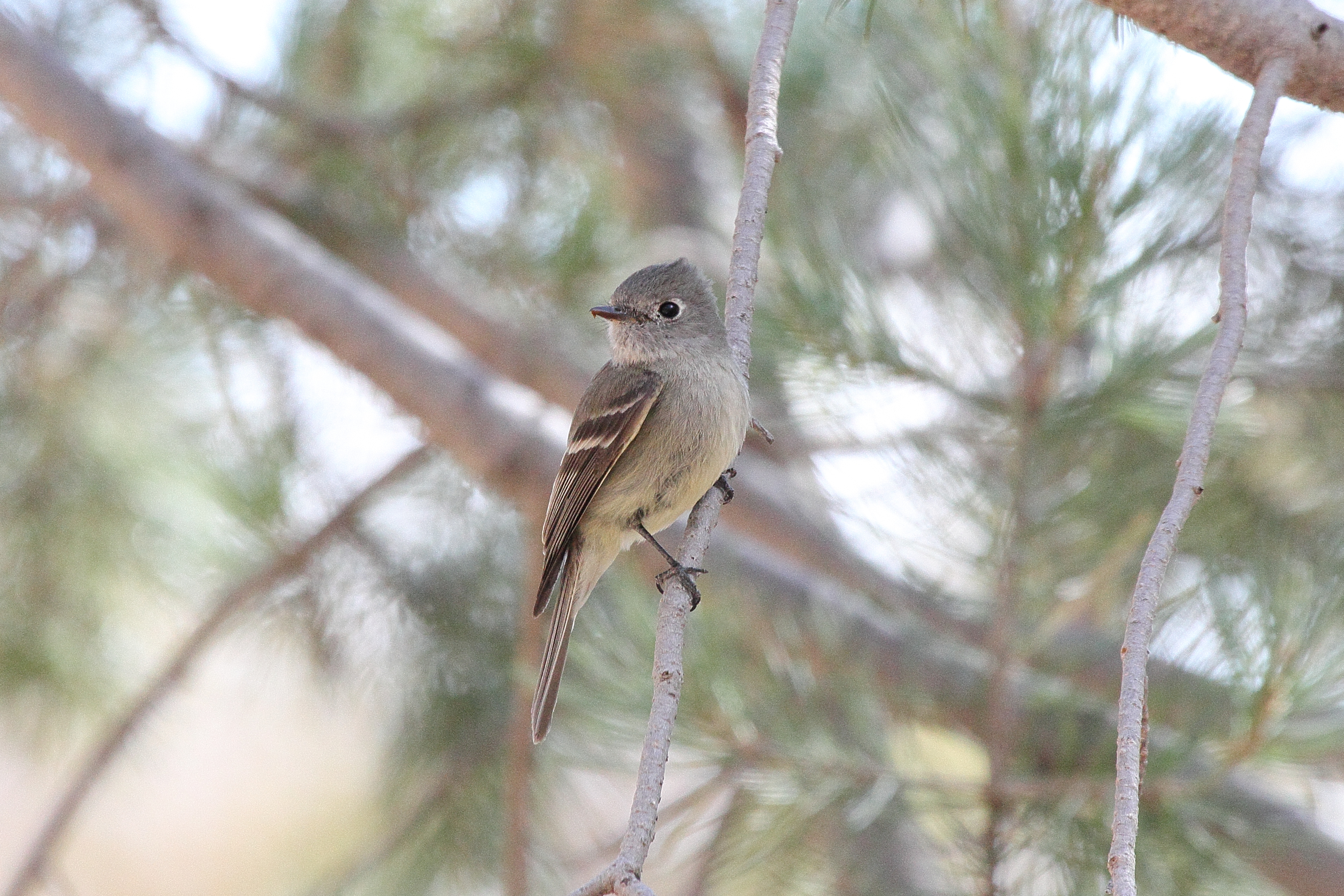

Conservation status
- Least Concern (IUCN 3.1)

Scientific classification
- Kingdom: Animalia
- Phylum: Chordata
- Class: Aves
- Order: Passeriformes
- Family: Tyrannidae
- Genus: Empidonax
- Species: E. hammondii

Binomial name
- Empidonax hammondii (Xántus, J, 1858)
- Breeding Migration Nonbreeding

= Hammond's flycatcher =

Species of bird

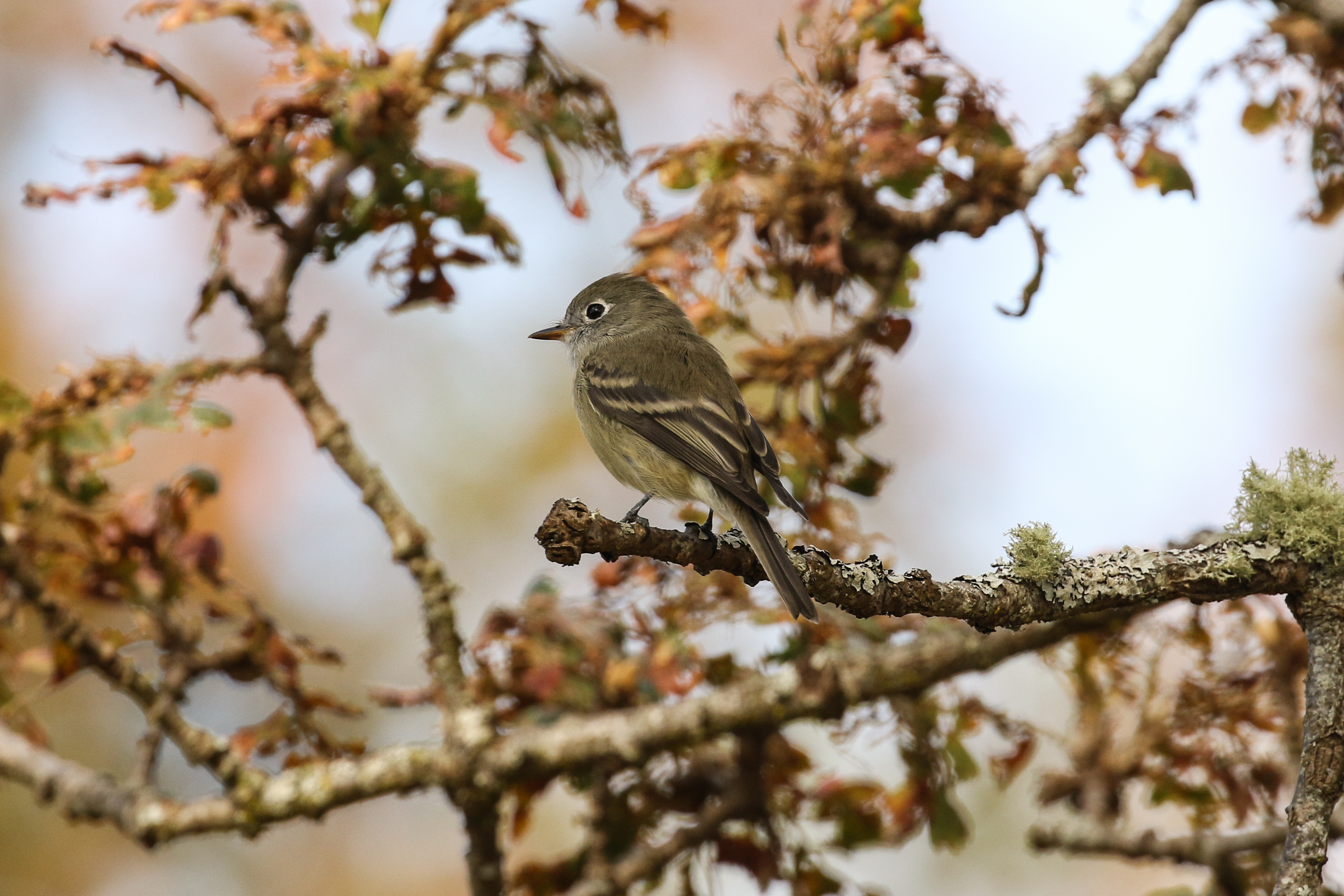
Hammond's flycatcher - Rocky Point, British Columbia

Hammond's flycatcher (Empidonax hammondii) is a flycatcher in the family Tyrannidae. This small insectivorous bird inhabits the coniferous and mixed forests of western North America. The name of this bird commemorates William Alexander Hammond who was the surgeon general of the US Army. Hammond collected bird specimens for Spencer Fullerton Baird.

== Description ==
Adults are 12–14 cm long (4.7–5.5 in), span about 22 cm (8.7 in) across the wing and weigh 8–12 g (0.3–04 oz). They have grayish-olive upperparts, darker on the wings and tail, with whitish underparts; they have a conspicuous white eye ring, white wing bars, a small bill and a short tail. The breast is washed with grey and the sides of the belly with yellow. Females usually have a shorter, wider bill than males. Immature birds are similar to adults, but have broader wing bars and are more buff.

Many species of Empidonax flycatchers are very similar in appearance. Hammond's flycatchers are mainly confused with Dusky (E. oberholseri) and Gray (E. wrightii) flycatchers, which are similar in color and size and have an overlapping range. The best way to distinguish Hammond's flycatcher is by its call, breeding habitat and/or range.

== Taxonomy ==
Hammond's flycatchers are part of the genus Empidonax, which includes a dozen of other species. Despite the relatively large range of the species, Hammond's flycatcher does not present a lot of genetic variations. This might be the result of a bottleneck event, that could have occurred when the species range was confined to the South of the Pleistocene ice. The bird's morphology, including its plumage, is also consistent across its range. However, there is evidence showing that some Hammond's flycatchers on Vancouver Island, in British Columbia, have evolved longer, thicker bills in the absence of Western flycatchers, which occupy a very similar niche, but usually have a thicker bill than Hammond's flycatcher. Hammond's, the Dusky and the Gray flycatchers are sister species, with no evidence of interbreeding.

== Habitat and distribution ==
Hammond's flycatcher is a migratory species, breeding in Western North America and wintering in Mexico and Central America.

=== Habitat ===
Their preferred breeding habitats are mature coniferous and mixed forests. They are typically found in dense fir forests, conifer and aspen forests and dogwood. Their wintering ground habitats are similar to those used as breeding grounds.

=== Distribution ===
Hammond's flycatchers can be found in the Western United States, including Montana, Wyoming, California, Oregon, Nevada, Utah, Arizona, New Mexico and Colorado. In Canada, their range includes British Columbia, Yukon and Alberta. Certain birds have been found as far north as Alaska. Overall, their breeding range is formed by regions that have been greatly influenced by past glaciation events. These birds are migratory and winter in Mexico and in Central America.

== Behavior ==
=== Vocalizations ===
The song is a multi-versed, hoarse ssilit, greeep, silit, pweet. The call is a sharp peek.

Hammond's flycatchers do not sing during the fall migration or on wintering grounds. They start singing in early May, shortly after their arrival on breeding grounds. The frequency of the song is usually higher at the beginning of the mating season and drops as summer progresses; males that do not have a partner sing more often and at a higher frequency than paired males.

Like in other species of the genus Empidonax, bill-snapping and mandible-clicking are commonly used in a threatening context.

=== Diet ===
Their favorite preys include beetles, flies, bees, butterflies and moths, with a mean length of 5.7 mm and a mean weight of 1.656 mg. True beetles, and net-winged insects can also be part of their diet. They often wait on an open perch in the upper parts of a tree and fly out to catch insects in flight (hawking), and are also known to pluck insects from foliage while hovering (gleaning).

=== Breeding ===
These birds are believed to be monogamous and show no evidence of extra-pair copulation. Male Hammond's flycatchers physically fight at the beginning of the breeding season, locking themselves together in midair and fluttering to the ground. They tend to nest high up in tall trees, on small to medium-sized branches. They prefer areas where they can be covered by leaves, on the northeast or southwest sides of trees, and prefer old-growth forest, with a minimum age of 80 to 90 years.

They make a cup nest on a fork in a tree. Females usually lay, in early June, three or four creamy white eggs, sometimes marked with small reddish-brown dots. The female incubates the eggs for about 15 days. The hatchlings are altricial; both the male and the female are responsible for feeding the young.
