= Empid =

Empid may refer to:

- A member of the Empididae family of flies
- A member of the Empidonax genus of North American tyrant flycatchers
