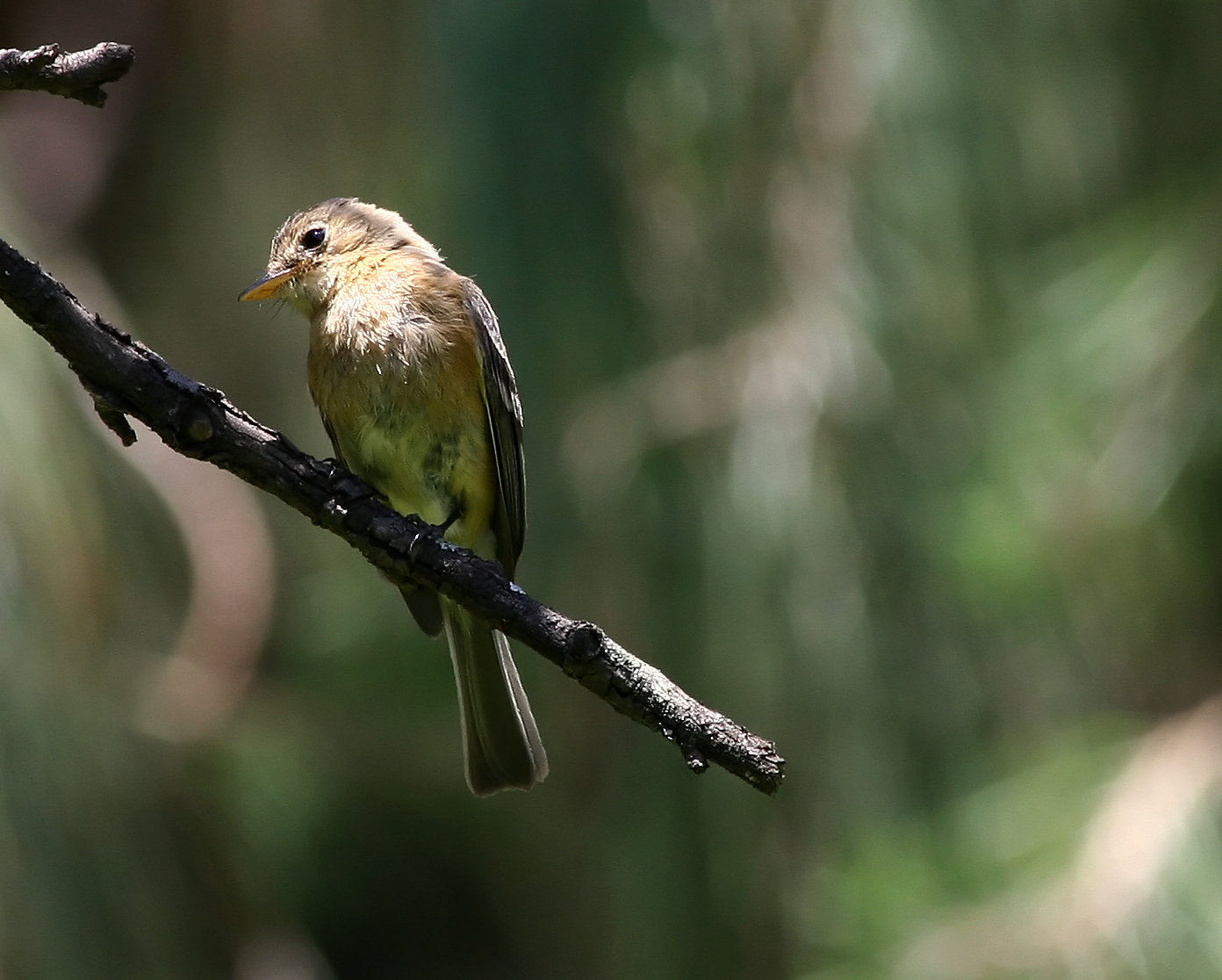

Conservation status
- Least Concern (IUCN 3.1)

Scientific classification
- Kingdom: Animalia
- Phylum: Chordata
- Class: Aves
- Order: Passeriformes
- Family: Tyrannidae
- Genus: Empidonax
- Species: E. fulvifrons

Binomial name
- Empidonax fulvifrons (Giraud, 1841)
- Breeding Year-round Non-Breeding

= Buff-breasted flycatcher =

Species of bird

The buff-breasted flycatcher (Empidonax fulvifrons) is a small passerine bird in the family Tyrannidae, the tyrant flycatchers. It is found from the southwestern U.S.A. to Honduras.

== Taxonomy and systematics ==
The buff-breasted flycatcher was originally described as Muscicapa fulvifrons, erroneously classified with the Old World flycatchers. Its current genus Empidonax was erected in 1855.

The buff-breasted flycatcher has these six subspecies:

- E. f. pygmaeus Coues, 1865
- E. f. fulvifrons (Giraud, 1841)
- E. f. rubicundus Cabanis & Heine, 1860
- E. f. brodkorbi Phillips, AR, 1966
- E. f. fusciceps Nelson, 1904
- E. f. inexpectatus Griscom, 1932

Some authors have questioned the validity of some subspecies, noting that E. f. fulvifrons and E. f. brodkorbi are formally known only from a single specimen of each.

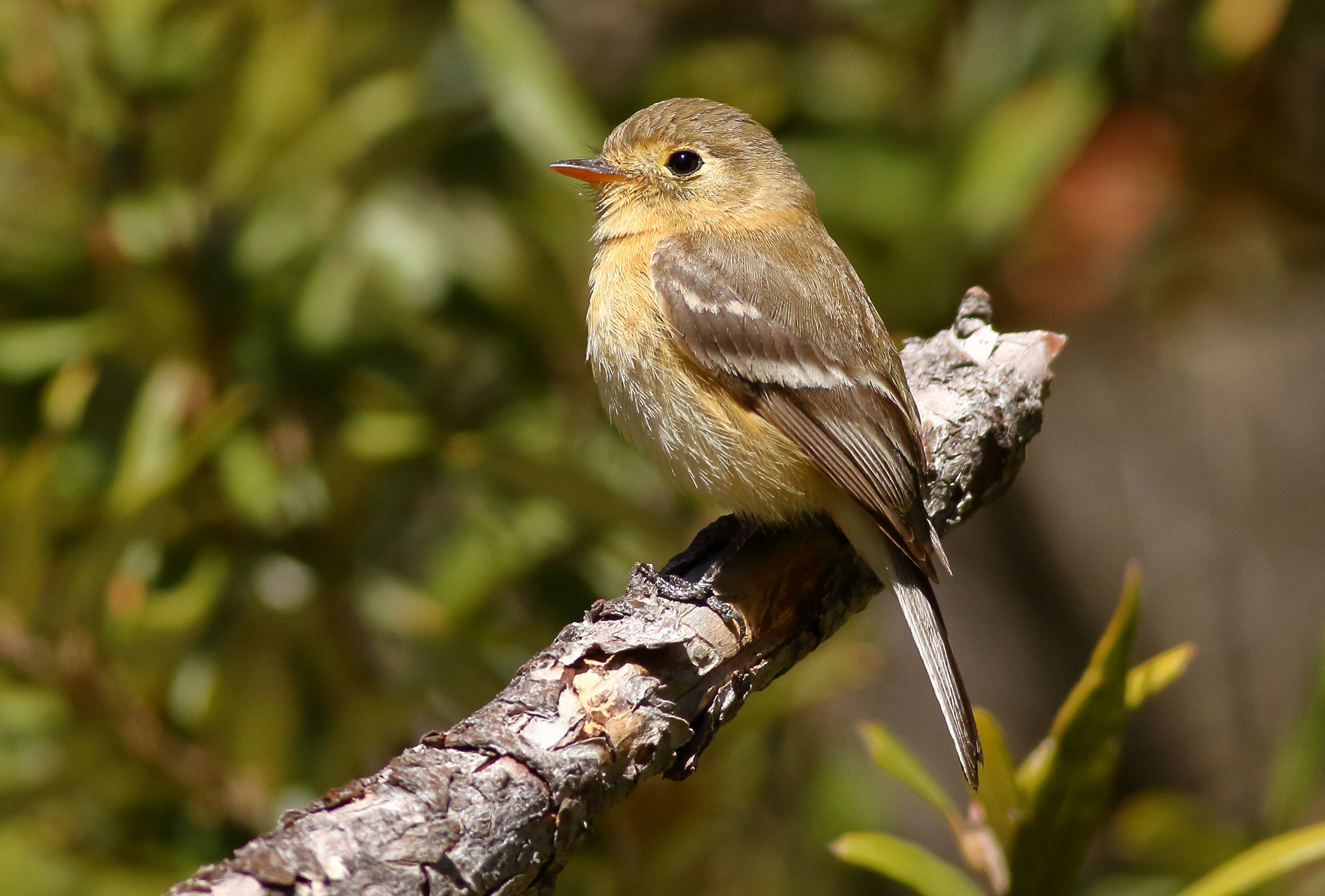
Buff-breasted flycatcher in Cochise County, Arizona.

== Description ==
The buff-breasted flycatcher is about 13 cm (5.1 in) long and weighs 6.9 to 9.3 g (0.24 to 0.33 oz). It is the smallest member of genus Empidonax in the US and among the smallest overall. The sexes are alike. Subspecies E. f. pygmaeus is the best known. Adults have dull buffy white lores and a faint dull buffy white eye-ring on an otherwise buffy greenish brown face. Their crown, nape, and upperparts are a darker buffy greenish brown than the face. Their tail is grayish brown with paler grayish white outer webs on the feathers. Their wings are deep grayish brown with pale grayish buff edges in the inner webs of the remiges. The wing coverts are deep grayish brown with pale grayish, buffy gray, or dull whitish tips that show as two wing bars. Their chin and throat are light yellowish buff, their breast tawny buff, and the rest of their underparts light yellowish buff or buff-yellow. The colors fade with wear. All subspecies have a deep chestnut-brown iris, a black maxilla, a yellow-orange mandible, and black legs and feet.

The other subspecies of the buff-breasted flycatcher differ from the nominate and each other thus:

- E. f. fulvifrons: larger, darker, and browner (less gray) than nominate
- E. f. rubicundus: larger and darker than nominate with warm brown back
- E. f. brodkorbi: rich olive-brown back and rich cinnamon breast
- E. f. fusciceps: similar to brodkorbi but darker
- E. f. inexpectatus: dark brown crown and brown back

== Distribution and habitat ==
The buff-breasted flycatcher has a disjunct distribution. The subspecies are found thus:

- E. f. pygmaeus: southeastern Arizona south in Mexico to the line northern Sinaloa – southern Nuevo León; formerly also further north in Arizona and in southwestern New Mexico
- E. f. fulvifrons: Tamaulipas in northeastern Mexico
- E. f. rubicundus: Mexico from southern Chihuahua and Durango south to the line Guerrero – western Veracruz
- E. f. brodkorbi: the single specimen is from southern Oaxaca, Mexico
- E. f. fusciceps: Chiapas in southern Mexico and into southern Guatemala
- E. f. inexpectatus: southern and south-central Honduras

During the breeding season and in its year-round range the buff-breasted flycatcher inhabits wide mountain canyons with open pine, pine-oak, and oak forest that has a grassy understory with some bushes. It often is found along watercourses. In the non-breeding season some move to lower elevation thorn-scrub. It overall ranges between 600 and 3,500 m (2,000 and 11,500 ft) of elevation. In Arizona it ranges between 1,950 and 2,850 m (6,400 and 9,400 ft). In Guatemala and Honduras it ranges between 600 and 3,200 m (2,000 and 10,500 ft).

== Behavior ==
=== Movement ===
The buff-breasted flycatcher is a partial migrant. Subspecies E. f. pygmaeus migrates south from the US and far northern Mexico after the breeding season. Movements of subspecies E. f. brodkorbi, if any, are unknown. The other four subspecies are generally year-round residents though some individuals of E. f. rubicundus move to lower elevations after breeding.

=== Feeding ===
The buff-breasted flycatcher feeds on insects. During the breeding season it typically forages in pairs, and singly outside that season. It forages mostly from the forest's understory to its mid-story and will descend to the ground. It captures prey in mid-air with sallies from a perch ("hawking") and from bare ground and grass.

=== Breeding ===
Most of the information about the buff-breasted flycatcher's breeding biology comes from Arizona. Its season there spans mid-April to late June. The female alone builds the nest, an open cup of small rootlets and leaves bound with spiderweb, with feathers, larger leaves, lichen, and bark on the outside. Most nests are in live trees, either on a branch away from the trunk or in the crotch of a branch with the trunk. Most have leaves or another branch above them. They have been recorded between 2.7 to 12 m (9 to 39 ft) above the ground. The clutch is three or four eggs. Eggs are matte creamy white with no markings. Only the female incubates, for 14 to 16 days. The female alone broods nestlings but both parents provision them. Fledging occurs 15 to 17 days after hatch. Brown-headed cowbirds have been recorded attempting to parasitize the nest but without success.

=== Vocalization ===
The buff-breasted flycatcher's song in Guatemala and Honduras is "a rapid ti'beuu! or pi'dew!" and its call there "a soft, liquid wit". Further north its song is described as chee-lick or chee-lick chou" and its call as "a single pit note".

== Status ==
The IUCN has assessed the buff-breasted flycatcher as being of Least Concern. It has a very large range; its estimated population of at least two million mature individuals is believed to be decreasing. No immediate threats have been identified. It is considered "uncommon and very local" in Arizona and "fairly common" in Guatemala and Honduras. Most of the species' U.S. range is on federal land including Fort Huachuca and Coronado National Forest.
