= San Pedro River Preserve =

Protected area in Pinal County, Arizona

- Location within Arizona
- Location: Dudleyville, Arizona
- Coordinates: 32°56′10″N 110°44′57″W
- Area: 820 acres (330 ha)

The San Pedro River Preserve is a Nature Conservancy preserve in Dudleyville, Arizona.

The Preserve comprises 820 acres (3.3 km^{2}) of deeded land along the San Pedro River acquired for the protection of southwestern willow flycatcher (Empidonax traillii extimus) habitat. There are two miles of cottonwood/willow riparian. It is one of several properties along the Lower San Pedro River owned and managed by The Nature Conservancy (TNC). This property isn't open to the general public, but permission to enter may be granted for research projects and groups—contact the preserve manager. Birds here are typical of this stretch of the river—many of the birds can be found at the public access crossings along the river both north and south of the property.

The money for the project was acquired through the Roosevelt Lake Mitigation project from the Salt River Project.

In July 2005, The Great Dudleyville Fire burned 250 acres near the preserve, destroying thirteen structures, before it was extinguished.
