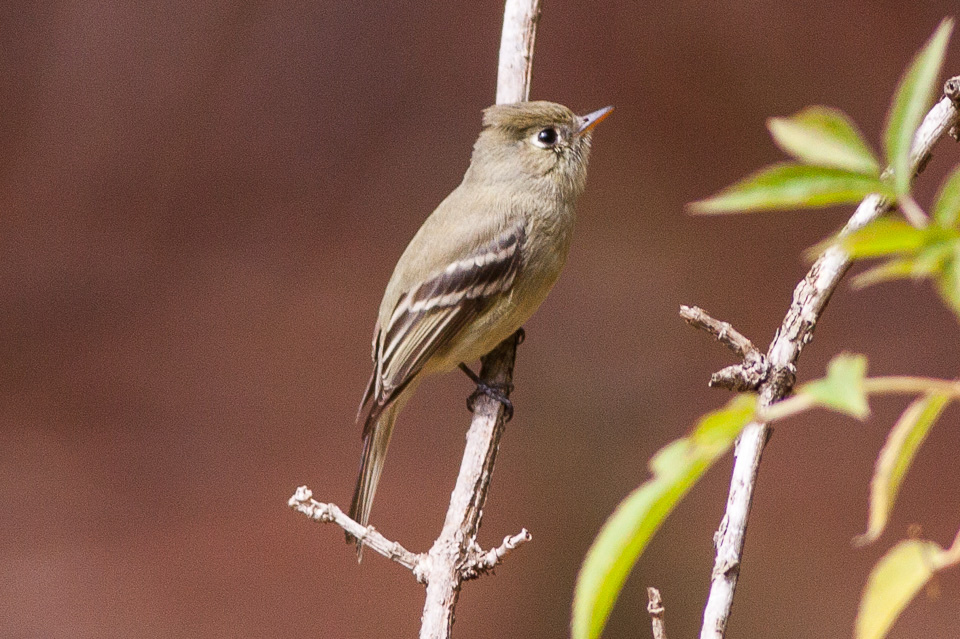

Conservation status
- Least Concern (IUCN 3.1)

Scientific classification
- Kingdom: Animalia
- Phylum: Chordata
- Class: Aves
- Order: Passeriformes
- Family: Tyrannidae
- Genus: Empidonax
- Species: E. affinis

Binomial name
- Empidonax affinis (Swainson, 1827)

= Pine flycatcher =

Species of bird

The pine flycatcher (Empidonax affinis) is a species of bird in the family Tyrannidae, the tyrant flycatchers. It is found in Guatemala and Mexico. It has also been recorded as a vagrant to Arizona in the U.S.A.

== Taxonomy and systematics ==
The pine flycatcher has these five subspecies:

- E. a. pulverius Brewster, 1889
- E. a. trepidus Nelson, 1901
- E. a. affinis (Swainson, 1827)
- E. a. bairdi Sclater, PL, 1858
- E. a. vigensis Phillips, AR, 1942

Vocal differences have been noted on the two sides of the Isthmus of Tehuantepec so there is conjecture that more than one species is represented.

== Description ==
The pine flycatcher is 13 to 14.5 cm (5.1 to 5.7 in) long and weighs about 11.5 g (0.41 oz). The sexes are alike. Adults of the nominate subspecies E. a. affinis have pale grayish lores and a whitish tear-shaped eye-ring that becomes a point behind the eye on an otherwise olive to grayish olive head. Their upperparts are also olive to grayish olive. Their tail is dusky. Their wings are mostly dusky, with whitish to buff tips on the coverts that show as two wing bars. The wing's secondaries and tertials have pale yellow edges. Their throat is pale grayish yellow and their underparts pale yellow with a gray or grayish olive wash across the breast. They have a dark iris, a black maxilla, an orange-yellow mandible, and blackish legs and feet. Juveniles have buffy wing bars.

The other subspecies of the pine flycatcher differ from the nominate and each other thus:

- E. a. pulverius: grayest back and breast of all subspecies
- E. a. trepidus: dark olive crown contrasting with lighter olive of back
- E. a. bairdi: slightly greener upperparts and slightly yellower underparts than others
- E. a. vigensis: duller than nominate but otherwise the same

== Distribution and habitat ==
The pine flycatcher has a disjunct distribution. The subspecies are found thus:

- E. a. pulverius: northwestern Mexico from southeastern Sonora and southwestern Chihuahua south to Jalisco
- E. a. trepidus: southeastern Coahuila to southwestern Tamaulipas in northeastern Mexico
- E. a. affinis: central Mexico from Michoacán south to Puebla
- E. a. bairdi: from Guerrero, Oaxaca, and Chiapas in southern Mexico into western Guatemala
- E. a. vigensis: west-central Veracruz in southeastern Mexico

A vagrant bird found in the Santa Rita Mountains, Arizona, in late May 2016 was the first record north of Mexico. An apparent record in 2009 from Choke Canyon State Park in southern Texas was later shown to be a least flycatcher (E. minimus).

The pine flycatcher inhabits pine savanna and the interior, edges, and openings of semi-arid to humid pine-oak forest. In elevation it overall ranges between 1,500 and 3,500 m (4,900 and 11,500 ft) but between 1,750 and 3,350 m (5,700 and 11,000 ft) in Guatemala.

== Behavior ==
=== Movement ===
The pine flycatcher is believed to be a year-round resident though it apparently makes some local movements after the breeding season.

=== Feeding ===
The pine flycatcher's diet and foraging behavior are almost unknown. It feeds on insects. In Mexico it apparently forages at all levels of the forest but in Guatemala only in its lower to mid-levels.

=== Breeding ===
The pine flycatcher's breeding season includes late May in Chiapas but is otherwise unknown. Its nest has not been formally described but is reported to be placed in a tree fork in the forest's mid-level. Nothing else is known about the species' breeding biology.

=== Vocalization ===
In northern and central Mexico the pine flycatcher's song is "2–4 phrases, prrp, p-wiet, chit p-p-p-reer or p-rip, p-rip, p'rr-ree". There it also has a fast "dri-i-irr" alarm trill and a "chu-wik" call. In Chiapas its song is "chri-k whee-u', chik-wheer or cheenk, cheenk, t-weeree". The species also makes "whip, pwip or whiup" calls. As of April 2025 xeno-canto had no recordings from Guatemala and the Cornell Lab of Ornithology's Macaulay Library had only one.

== Status ==
The IUCN has assessed the pine flycatcher as being of Least Concern. It has a very large range; its estimated population of at least 50,000 mature individuals is believed to be decreasing. No immediate threats have been identified. It is considered "common to fairly common, but often local" in Mexico but "rare to uncommon" in Guatemala.
