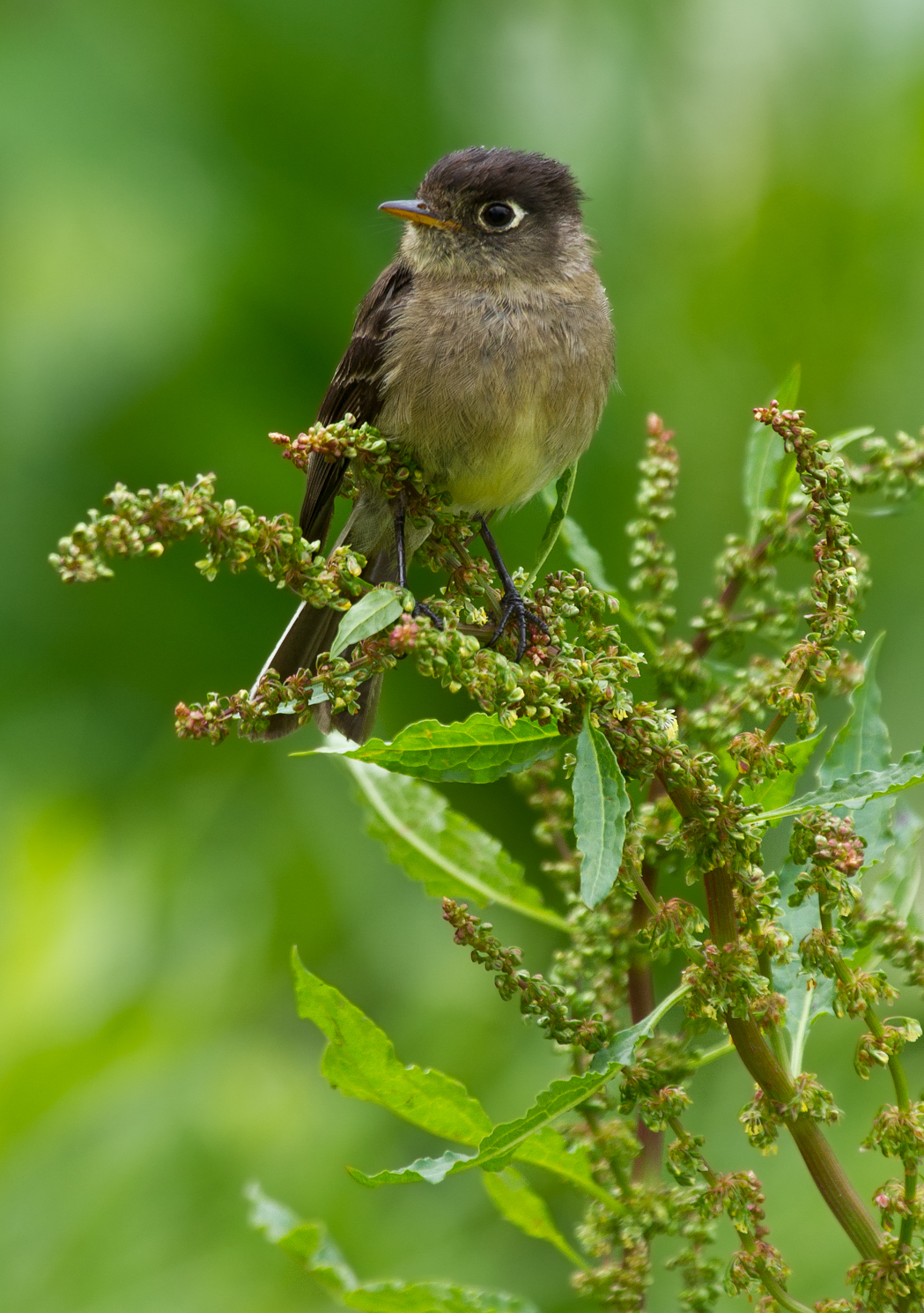

Conservation status
- Least Concern (IUCN 3.1)

Scientific classification
- Kingdom: Animalia
- Phylum: Chordata
- Class: Aves
- Order: Passeriformes
- Family: Tyrannidae
- Genus: Empidonax
- Species: E. atriceps

Binomial name
- Empidonax atriceps Salvin, 1870

= Black-capped flycatcher =

Species of bird

The black-capped flycatcher (Empidonax atriceps) is a very small passerine bird in the family Tyrannidae, the tyrant flycatchers. It is found in Costa Rica and Panama.

== Taxonomy and systematics ==
The black-capped flycatcher is monotypic.

== Description ==
The black-capped flycatcher is 10 to 12 cm (3.9 to 4.7 in) long and weighs about 9 g (0.32 oz). The sexes are alike. Adults have a black crown with a short crest and a bold white eye-ring that is wider behind the eye on an otherwise brownish olive face. These features by themselves set it apart from all other Empidonax. Their nape and upperparts are also brownish olive. Their tail is dusky with white outer webs on the outer feathers. Their wings are dusky with pale brown edges on the secondaries and tertials. The wing coverts are dusky with pale brown tips that show as two wing bars. Their throat is white and their breast and belly pale buffish cinnamon. They have a dark iris, a black maxilla, an orange-yellow mandible with a dark tip, and blackish legs and feet. Juveniles have a slightly duller black cap than adults with browner upperparts, buffy edges and tips on the wing feathers, and a paler belly.

== Distribution and habitat ==
The black-capped flycatcher has a disjunct distribution. It is found in Costa Rica on the Cordillera Central, the Dota Mountains, and the Cordillera de Talamanca. Its range continues on the last of these into western Panama's Chiriquí and Bocas del Toro provinces. It mostly inhabits primary and secondary montane evergreen forest in the upper subtropical and temperate zones, and also shrubby pastures. In elevation it mostly ranges from 2,100 to 3,300 m (6,900 to 10,800 ft), the upper reaches of which are at the lower edge of the páramo zone. It sometimes goes as low as 1,850 m (6,100 ft) in the rainy season.

== Behavior ==
=== Movement ===
The black-capped flycatcher is essentially a year-round resident; however, some downward movement is made during the rainy season.

=== Feeding ===
The black-capped flycatcher feeds on insects. It perches high in the forest canopy or, in more open areas, on a bush or fence. It captures prey in mid-air with sallies from it ("hawking") and often returns to the same perch. It quivers the tail when it lands.

=== Breeding ===
The black-capped flycatcher breeds between March and May. Its nest is an open cup made from grass and mosses and lined with fine plant fibers, horsehair, and other soft material. Nests have been noted between 2 and 12 m (7 and 39 ft) above the ground in branch saddles of trees and shrubs and also suspended from grass overhanging an earthen embankment. The typical clutch is two eggs. The incubation period, time to fledging, and details of parental care are not known.

=== Vocalization ===
The black-capped flycatcher has a variety of vocalizations. It makes a "loud keep-keer" in the breeding season, a keep-keep-keep-keep during interactions with others of its species, and "simple whistled tsip, chip, or whit" calls.

== Status ==
The IUCN has assessed the black-capped flycatcher as being of Least Concern. It has a limited range; its estimated population of between 20,000 and 50,000 mature individuals is believed to be stable. No immediate threats have been identified. It is considered common in Costa Rica. Much of the forest in its range has been cleared but the species "[p]erhaps benefits from shrubby second-growth vegetation arising following habitat disturbance or pasture abandonment".
