= Dudleyville, Arizona =

CDP in Pinal County, Arizona

- CDP
- Location in Pinal County and the state of Arizona

- Location in the United States
- Coordinates: 32°55′47″N 110°44′2″W
- Country: United States
- State: Arizona
- County: Pinal

Area
  - Total: 6.71 sq mi (17.37 km^{2})
  - Land: 6.71 sq mi (17.37 km^{2})
  - Water: 0 sq mi (0.00 km^{2})
- Elevation: 1,946 ft (593 m)

Population (2020)
  - Total: 597
  - Density: 89.0/sq mi (34.36/km^{2})
- Time zone: UTC-7 (MST (no DST))
- ZIP code: 85192
- Area code: 520
- FIPS code: 04-20680
- GNIS feature ID: 24402

Dudleyville is a census-designated place (CDP) in Pinal County, Arizona, United States. The population was 597 at the 2020 census, down from 959 at the 2010 census.

== Geography ==
Dudleyville is located at 32°55′47″N 110°44′2″W (32.929812, -110.733899).

According to the United States Census Bureau, the CDP has a total area of 6.9 square miles (18 km^{2}), all land.

The village includes the San Pedro River Preserve and the Dudleyville Volunteer Fire District.

Dudleyville was the site of the 2017 Roach Fire, which consumed nearly 1,200 acres.

== History ==
During the 1870s ranchers moved cattle into the lands along the lower San Pedro River. At what would become Dudleyville, a stage station opened in the late 1870s along the Globe to Tucson stage road. On May 8, 1881, William Dudley Harrington, operator of the stage station, was appointed first post master of the new post office of Dudleyville. Harrington and his wife Amanda Jane Crowley were from Missouri and had moved to California before settling with their family on a farm along the San Pedro. The small village of Dudleyville, with stage stop, mercantile and post office, farms, ranches, and prospectors, was a small regional center for two and a half decades. The village was eclipsed by the new town site of Winkleman, a mile north near the mouth of the San Pedro River on the Gila River, with the opening of the Phoenix & Eastern Railroad on September 28, 1904, to the new rail town.

== Demographics ==
Historical population
Census	Pop.	Note	%±
2000	1,323		—
2010	959		−27.5%
2020	597		−37.7%
U.S. Decennial Census

As of the census of 2000, there were 1,323 people, 454 households, and 345 families residing in the CDP. The population density was 192.3 inhabitants per square mile (74.2/km^{2}). There were 572 housing units at an average density of 83.1 per square mile (32.1/km^{2}). The racial makeup of the CDP was 62.0% White, 0.1% Black or African American, 2.1% Native American, 0.1% Asian, 0.3% Pacific Islander, 32.7% from other races, and 2.7% from two or more races. 59.0% of the population were Hispanic or Latino of any race.

There were 454 households, out of which 36.6% had children under the age of 18 living with them, 56.4% were married couples living together, 12.3% had a female householder with no husband present, and 23.8% were non-families. 20.0% of all households were made up of individuals, and 7.7% had someone living alone who was 65 years of age or older. The average household size was 2.91 and the average family size was 3.35.

In the CDP, the population was spread out, with 32.8% under the age of 18, 7.4% from 18 to 24, 25.5% from 25 to 44, 22.7% from 45 to 64, and 11.6% who were 65 years of age or older. The median age was 33 years. For every 100 females, there were 103.5 males. For every 100 females age 18 and over, there were 101.1 males.

The median income for a household in the CDP was $35,592, and the median income for a family was $37,200. Males had a median income of $31,948 versus $25,800 for females. The per capita income for the CDP was $13,072. About 8.6% of families and 13.6% of the population were below the poverty line, including 22.5% of those under age 18 and 7.9% of those age 65 or over.
