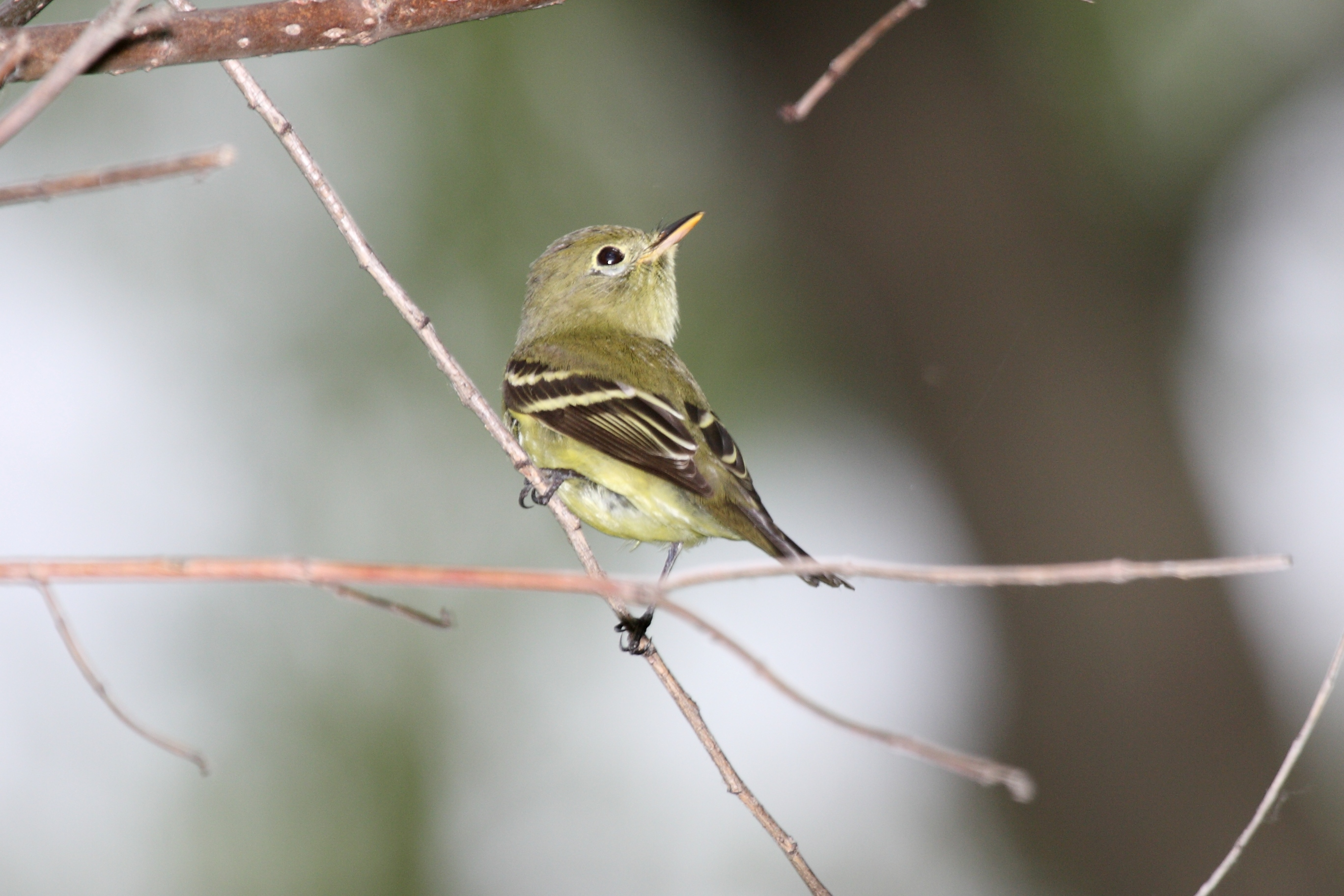

Conservation status
- Least Concern (IUCN 3.1)

Scientific classification
- Kingdom: Animalia
- Phylum: Chordata
- Class: Aves
- Order: Passeriformes
- Family: Tyrannidae
- Genus: Empidonax
- Species: E. flaviventris

Binomial name
- Empidonax flaviventris (Baird, WM & S.F. Baird, 1843)
- Approximate distribution map Breeding Migration Non-breeding

= Yellow-bellied flycatcher =

Species of bird

The yellow-bellied flycatcher (Empidonax flaviventris) is a small insect-eating bird of the tyrant flycatcher family.

== Description ==
Adults have greenish upperparts and yellowish underparts (especially on the throat), with a dusky wash on the chest. They have a white or yellow eye ring that lacks the teardrop projection of the western flycatcher, white or yellowish wing bars that contrast strongly against the black wings, a broad, flat bill, and a relatively short tail when compared to other members of the genus. The upper mandible of the bill is dark, while the lower mandible is orange-pink. DNA testing in 2014 confirmed a field mark, involving the extent of buffy edging on the secondaries, to reliably distinguish this species from the western flycatcher.

Measurements:

- Length: 5.1–5.9 in (13–15 cm)
- Weight: 0.3–0.6 oz (8.5–17.0 g)
- Wingspan: 7.1–7.9 in (18–20 cm)

Yellow-bellied flycatchers wait on a perch low or in the middle of a tree and fly out to catch insects in flight, sometimes hovering over foliage. They sometimes eat berries or seeds.

Yellow-bellied flycatcher song, recorded in Minnesota in late May

The yellow-bellied flycatcher's song can be transcribed as a rough, descending "tse-berk", which can be similar to the more common least flycatcher's snappier, more evenly pitched "che-bek."

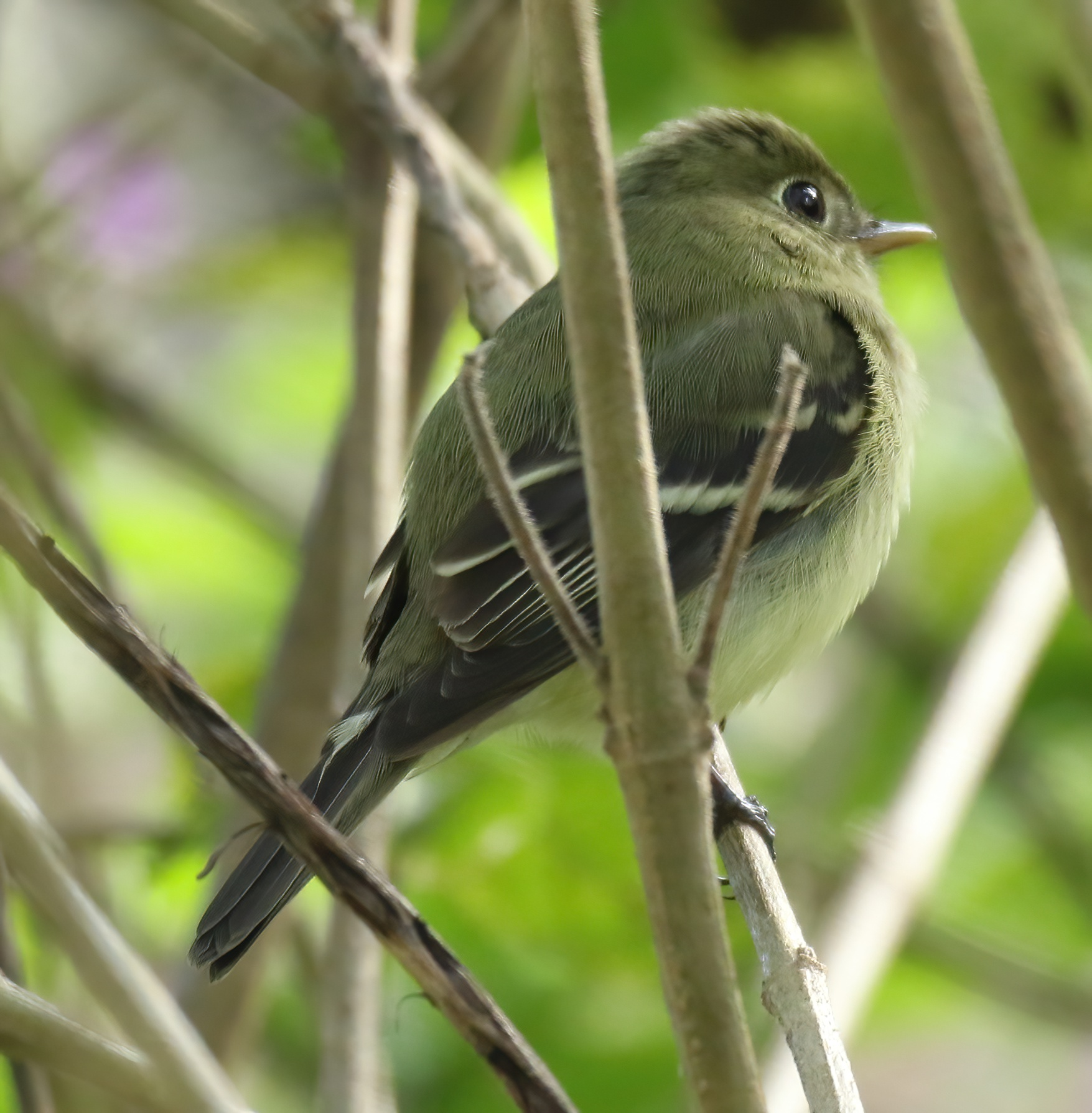
Yellow-bellied Flycatcher at Rancho Naturalista Baja - Costa Rica

== Breeding ==
Their breeding habitat is wet northern woods, especially spruce bogs, across Canada and the northeastern United States. They make a cup nest in sphagnum moss on or near the ground.

== Migration ==
These birds migrate to southern Mexico and Central America.
