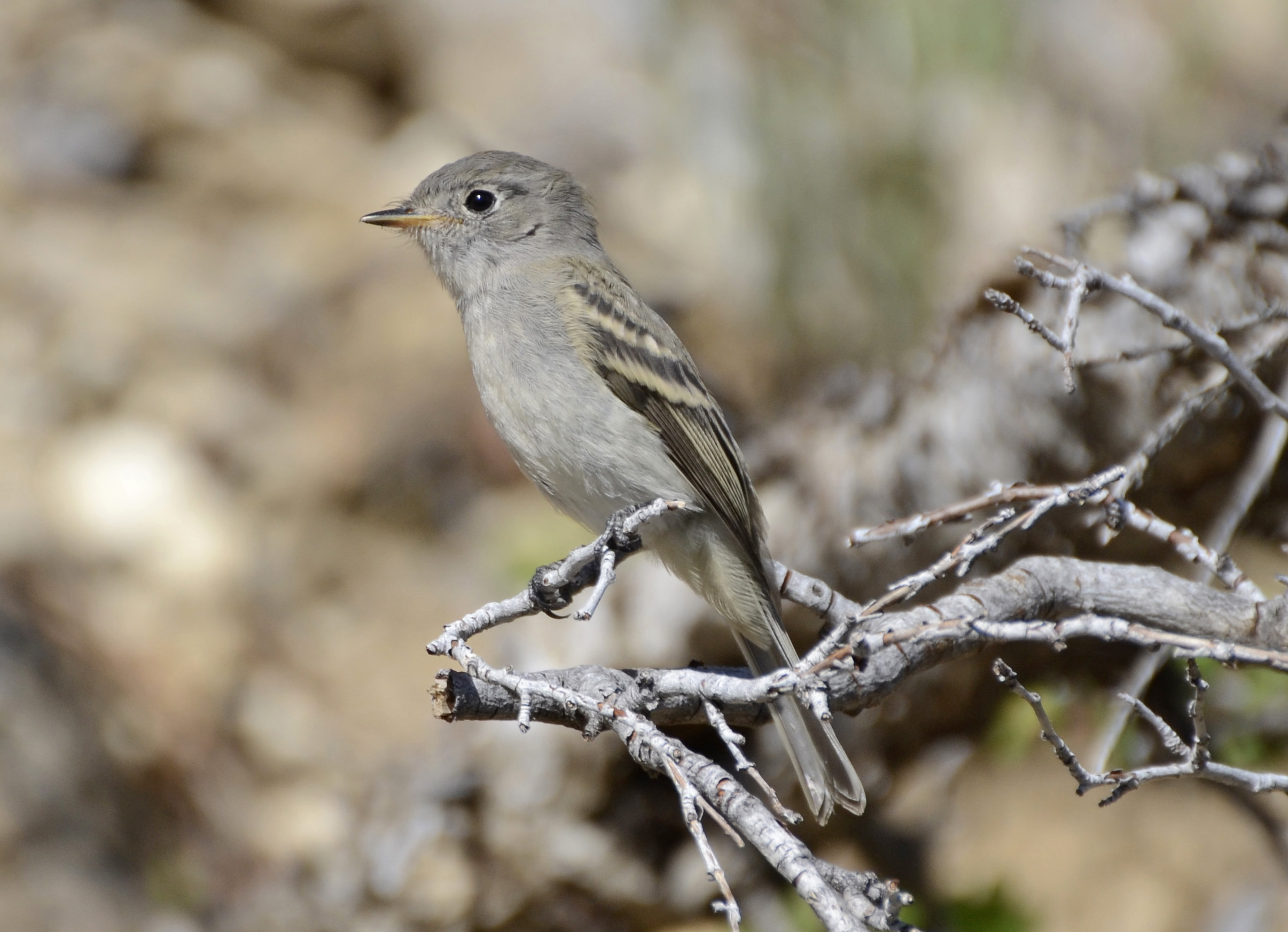

Conservation status
- Least Concern (IUCN 3.1)

Scientific classification
- Kingdom: Animalia
- Phylum: Chordata
- Class: Aves
- Order: Passeriformes
- Family: Tyrannidae
- Genus: Empidonax
- Species: E. oberholseri

Binomial name
- Empidonax oberholseri Phillips, AR, 1939
- Breeding Migration Nonbreeding

= American dusky flycatcher =

Species of bird

The American dusky flycatcher (Empidonax oberholseri), or simply dusky flycatcher, is a small insectivorous passerine of the tyrant flycatcher family.

The dusky flycatcher is one of many species in the genus Empidonax. These species are very similar in appearance and behavior, and they are notoriously difficult to differentiate. The best characteristics for distinguishing these species are voice, breeding habitat, and range.

== Description ==
Adults have olive-gray upperparts, darker on the wings and tail, with whitish underparts; they have a noticeable medium-width white eye ring, white wing bars and a medium length tail. The breast is washed with olive-gray. The bill is mainly dark. It is a bit smaller than the American grey flycatcher and a bit larger than the Hammond's flycatcher.

=== Vocalizations ===
The male sings a three-part song. A common call is a dry whit, similar to that of other Empidonax flycatchers. A less common call, that is possibly only given by the male, is a sad dew-hic.

== Taxonomy ==
The scientific name commemorates the American ornithologist Harry Church Oberholser.

== Distribution ==
These birds migrate to southern Arizona and Mexico. As non-breeding residents in the south of their migration range, they are passage migrants over the deserts of the south-western United States, the Mojave, Sonoran, and Chihuahuan Deserts, where they make their stops along the flyway.

== Habitat ==
Their breeding habitat is mountain slopes and foothills with brush and scattered trees (especially ponderosa pine) across western North America. They make a cup nest low in a vertical fork in a shrub.

== Behavior ==
They often wait on an open perch and fly out to catch insects in flight (hawking), and will also pluck insects from foliage while hovering (gleaning).
