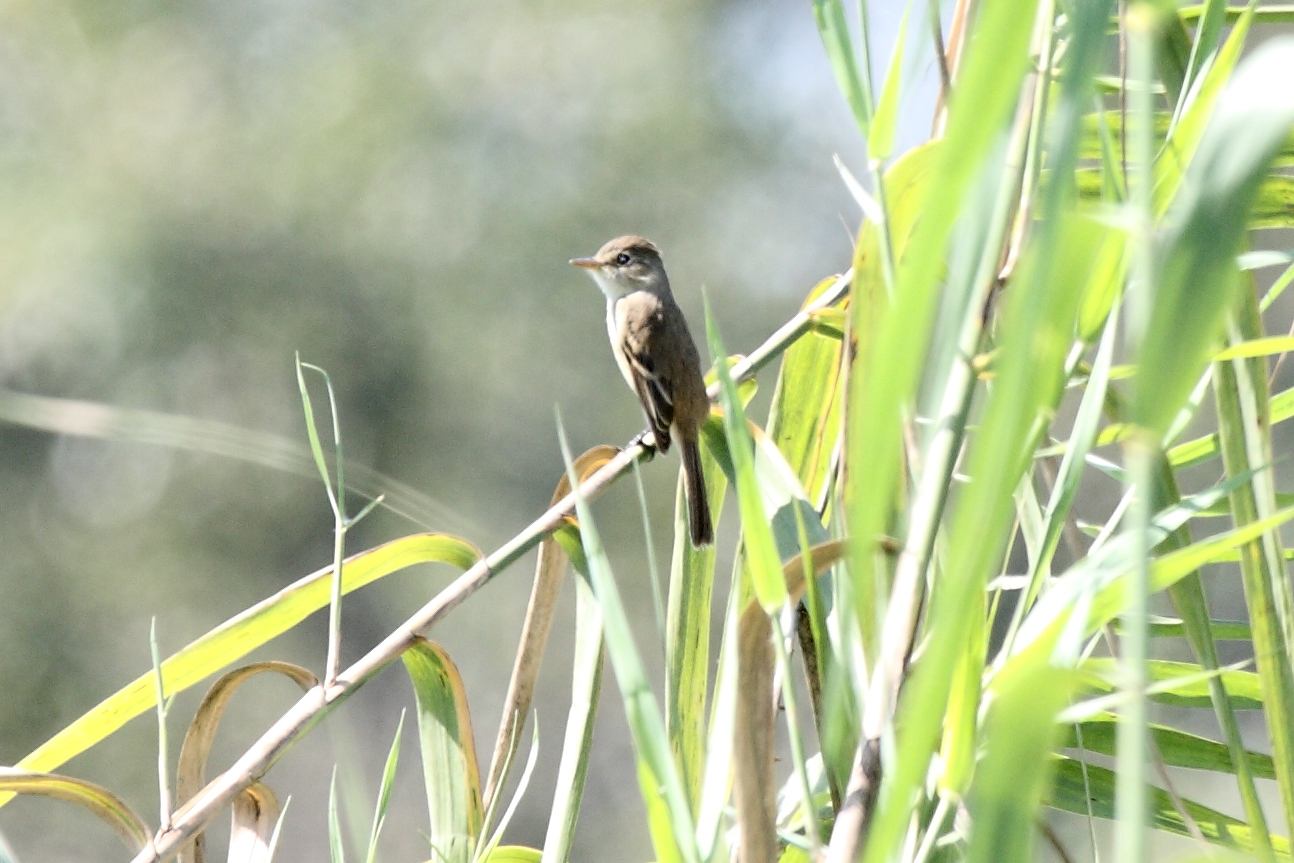

Conservation status
- Least Concern (IUCN 3.1)

Scientific classification
- Kingdom: Animalia
- Phylum: Chordata
- Class: Aves
- Order: Passeriformes
- Family: Tyrannidae
- Genus: Empidonax
- Species: E. albigularis

Binomial name
- Empidonax albigularis Sclater, PL & Salvin, 1859
- Breeding Year-round Non-Breeding

= White-throated flycatcher =

Species of bird

The white-throated flycatcher (Empidonax albigularis) is a species of bird in the family Tyrannidae, the tyrant flycatchers. It is found in Mexico and every country in Central America.

== Taxonomy and systematics ==
The white-throated flycatcher has three subspecies, the nominate E. a. albigularis (Sclater, PL & Salvin, 1859), E. a. timidus (Nelson, 1900), and E. a. australis (Miller, W & Griscom, 1925). These subdivisions "are not solidly established" due to their similarity and the relatively small number, age, and season of collection of specimens.

== Description ==
The white-throated flycatcher is 12 to 14 cm (4.7 to 5.5 in) long. Three individuals weighed 10.4 to 11 g (0.37 to 0.39 oz). The sexes are alike. Adults of the nominate subspecies have a brownish olive or olive brown crown and dull buffy-white lores and eye-ring on an otherwise paler brownish olive or olive brown face. Their upperparts are brownish olive or olive brown. Their tail is deep grayish brown with light brownish olive on the feather edges. Their wings are mostly a darker grayish brown than the upperparts, with wide light buffy brown or brownish buff tips on the median and greater coverts that show prominently as two wing bars. The wing's secondaries have pale buffy grayish or grayish buff edges. Their chin and throat are dull white, their breast buffy olive brownish that is paler on the sides and flanks, their belly pale buffy yellow or yellowish buff, and their undertail coverts brownish buff. They have a dark brown iris, a black maxilla, a pink-orange or yellowish pink mandible often with a dusky outer half, and blackish legs and feet. Immature birds have more brownish upperparts and more buffy underparts than adults, with cinnamon wing bars and pale buffy brown edges on the secondaries. Subspecies E. a. timidus is slightly larger than the nominate with paler upperparts, less buffy wing bars, and brighter buffy-yellowish flanks. E. a. australis has slightly more olivaceous (less brown) upperparts than the nominate, with whiter lores, eye-ring, and wing bars, a less brownish breast, and yellower belly, flanks, and vent area.

"A comparative review of photos from the Macaulay Library across the species' range does not appear to support these phenotypic differences, and a taxonomic review of subspecies may be in order."

== Distribution and habitat ==
The white-throated flycatcher has a disjunct distribution. Subspecies E. a. timidus is found on the Pacific slope of western Mexico from far southeastern Sonora and southwestern Chihuahua south to Morelos. The nominate subspecies is more widespread. It is found on the Caribbean slope from southwestern Tamaulipas south through eastern and southern Mexico and discontinuously south through Belize, Guatemala, El Salvador and Honduras. It possibly winters further south. E. a. australis is found discontinuously from Nicaragua south through Costa Rica into western Panama's Chiriquí Province. There are also scattered records further south in Panama to the Canal Zone.

In the breeding season the white-throated flycatcher inhabits open and partially open landscapes in the subtropical and lower temperate zones. It is generally near water, such as in wet meadows with brush or hedgerows and vegetation along streams and irrigation ditches. It also inhabits openings in higher elevation pine-oak forest. In the non-breeding season it moves in part to the tropical zone where it favors freshwater marshes with tall rushes and weeds and scrubby edges. In Mexico it ranges between 1,200 and 3,000 m (3,900 and 9,800 ft) of elevation in the breeding season and between sea level and 1,200 m (3,900 ft) in the non-breeding season. In northern Central America it breeds between 600 and 2,500 m (2,000 and 8,200 ft) and winters almost to sea level. In Nicaragua it occurs between 1,000 and 1,500 m (3,300 and 4,900 ft) and in Costa Rica mostly between 500 and 1,500 m (1,600 and 4,900 ft).

== Behavior ==
=== Movement ===
The white-throated flycatcher is highly migratory in most of its range; most of the movement is elevational. In Mexico it breeds in the Sierra Madre Occidental, the Trans-Mexican Volcanic Belt, the Sierra Madre del Sur, and the Sierra Madre Oriental. It primarily winters in the lowlands on both the Caribbean and Pacific slopes south from about the middle of the country. It breeds patchily in the highlands of Guatemala, Honduras, and El Salvador and winters lower, primarily in northeastern Guatemala, Belize, and central Honduras. The species appears to be a year-round resident in the highlands of Costa Rica though there is some evidence of elevational movement there. There is speculation that lowland records in Costa Rica and Panama are of migrants from further north.

=== Feeding ===
The white-throated flycatcher feeds mostly on insects and includes a small amount of fruit in its diet. It perches low to the ground in or on the edge of open areas and captures prey in mid-air with sallies from it ("hawking") or by gleaning from vegetation after a short flight. It quivers the wings and tail when it lands back on a perch.

=== Breeding ===
The white-throated flycatcher's breeding season has not been fully defined but includes April to July or August in Honduras and mostly within that span elsewhere. Its nest is an open cup made from dried grass and seed heads lined with finer material, usually placed fairly low to the ground in a shrub or small tree. One nest contained three eggs that were creamy with burnt umber spots around the larger end. The incubation period and time to fledging are not known. Both parents provision nestlings but other details of parental care are not known.

=== Vocalization ===
The white-throated flycatcher is quite vocal. Its song in northern Central America is "a slightly 2-part rrrreea'ah!" and its call "a harsh, raspy, somewhat nasal rreeaah! or eaaahh!." Both vocalizations are similar elsewhere it the species' range.

== Status ==
The IUCN has assessed the white-throated flycatcher as being of Least Concern. It has a very large range; its estimated population of at least 50,000 mature individuals is believed to be decreasing. No immediate threats have been identified. It is considered "uncommon to fairly common, but local" in Mexico and rare in Panama. It is "uncommon and local" in northern Central America. In Costa Rica it is "fairly common around the western and southern base of Irazú Volcano". It is uncommon along the country's cordilleras and very rare in the intermontane valleys in the south. "Human activity has little short-term direct effect on this species, other than the local effects of habitat destruction."
