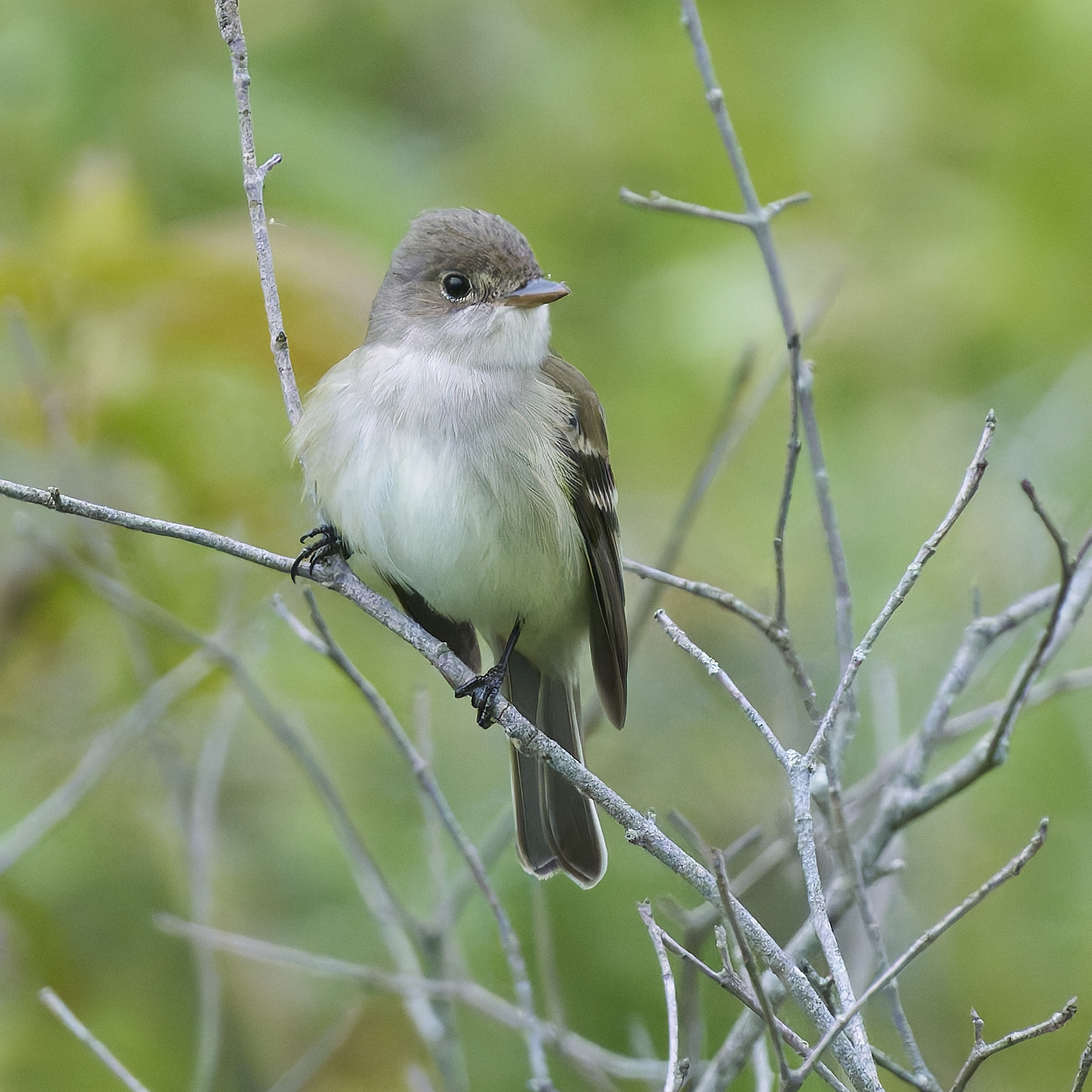
- E. t. traillii, Connecticut

Conservation status
- Least Concern (IUCN 3.1)

Scientific classification
- Kingdom: Animalia
- Phylum: Chordata
- Class: Aves
- Order: Passeriformes
- Family: Tyrannidae
- Genus: Empidonax
- Species: E. traillii

Binomial name
- Empidonax traillii (Audubon, 1828)
- Approximate distribution map Breeding Migration Non-breeding

Audio
- Empidonax traillii call

= Willow flycatcher =

Species of bird

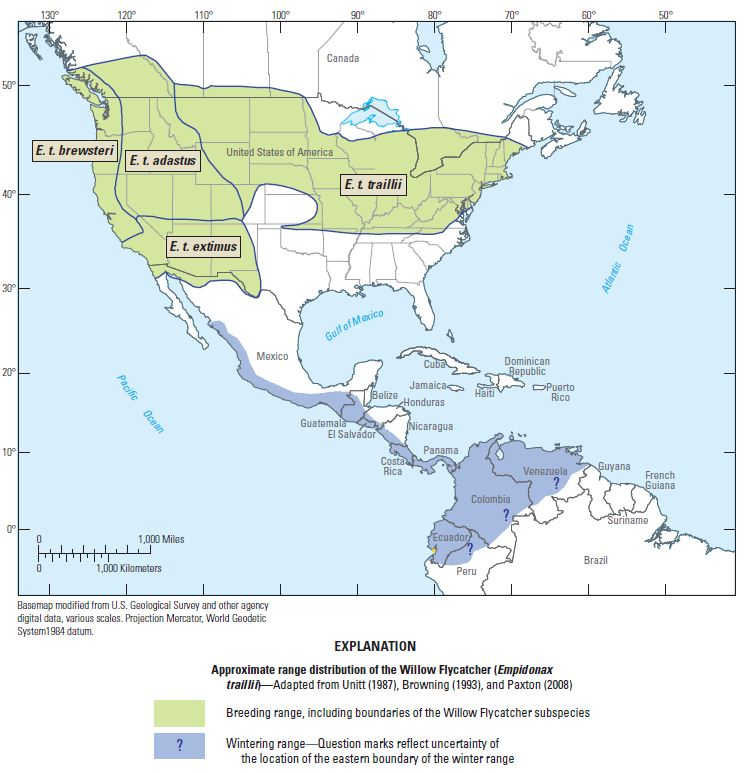
Summer breeding and winter ranges of willow flycatcher subspecies from USGS southwestern willow flycatcher survey protocol

The willow flycatcher (Empidonax traillii) is a small insect-eating, migrant bird of the tyrant flycatcher family native to North America.

== Taxonomy ==
The willow flycatcher was included by the Franco-American ornithologist John James Audubon in his book The Birds of America based on a specimen collected in the "woods along the prairie banks of the Arkansas River". The section of the book containing the willow flycatcher was published in 1828. There are two variants of the plate illustrating the flycatcher. On one the binomial name is given as Muscicapa trailli and on the other as Muscicapa traillii. The latter spelling was used in 1831 by Audubon when describing the species in his Ornithological Biography that was published to accompany the plates and is now the accepted spelling. The specific epithet was chosen by Audubon to honour his friend the Scottish physician and zoologist Thomas Stewart Traill. The willow flycatcher is now one of 14 species placed in the genus Empidonax that was introduced in 1855 by the German ornithologist Jean Cabanis.

There are four subspecies recognized, all of which breed in North America (including three subspecies that breed in California). At one time, this bird and the alder flycatcher (Empidonax alnorum) were considered to be a single species, Traill's flycatcher. Their song is the only reliable method to tell them apart in the field.

=== Subspecies ===
The subspecies are best distinguished from each other by their songs. In addition, the four subspecies have significant genetic differences based on mitochondrial DNA analysis. Their winter ranges have been elucidated using mitochondrial DNA genetic studies of 172 birds sampled in winter combined with plumage coloration and morphological differences.

The four subspecies of the willow flycatcher are:

==== E. t. brewsteri Oberholser, 1918 – Little willow flycatcher ====
The little willow flycatcher (E.t. brewsteri) is the Pacific Slope subspecies of the willow flycatcher. Described by Oberholser in 1918, it breeds in California from Tulare County north along the western side of the Sierra Nevada, and in Oregon and Washington west of the Cascade range.

==== E. t. adastus Oberholser, 1932 ====
The Great Basin/Northern Rockies subspecies of the willow flycatcher (E. t. adastus) breeds in California east of the Sierra/Cascade axis, from the Oregon border into Modoc County and possibly into northern Inyo County. Populations at high elevation just east of the Sierra Nevada crest but south of Modoc County are assumed to be E. t. brewsteri. There has been very little study of E. t. adastus in California. It was described by Oberholser in 1932.

==== E. t. extimus Phillips, AR, 1948 – Southwestern willow flycatcher ====
The southwestern willow flycatcher (E. t. extimus) is a federally endangered subspecies found in Arizona, California, Colorado, Nevada, New Mexico, Texas, and Utah. It was listed in 1995, when it was known to breed at only about 75 sites in riparian areas throughout the American southwest. The breeding population was estimated at between 300 and 500 pairs. Breeding occurs from near sea level on the Santa Margarita River to 800 m (2,640 ft) at the South Fork Kern River and 910 m (3,000 ft) at upper San Luis Rey River in California and to over 2,600 m (8,530 ft) in Arizona, southwestern Colorado, and north-central New Mexico. This subspecies was described by A.R. Phillips in 1948.

The largest remaining population in California is on the South Fork Kern River, Kern County. In southern California, this subspecies breeds on the San Luis Rey River, at Camp Pendleton, the Santa Margarita River and Pilgrim, De Luz, French, and Las Flores creeks; as well as on the Santa Ynez River. In 1996, breeding was confirmed along the Arizona side of the lower Colorado River at Lake Mead Delta and at Topock Marsh. Examination of museum specimens of 578 migrating and wintering E. t. extimus indicate that Guatemala to Costa Rica constitutes the main winter range.

This species is experiencing population declines throughout the Southwest due to habitat loss/alteration and invasive grass species. One of these is saltcedar (Tamarix ramosissima), found throughout the Southwest, where it has replaced essential vegetation by outcompeting native species in riparian areas where the southwestern willow flycatcher is found. In two sites, one in Arizona and the other in New Mexico, native trees were able to replace patches of saltcedar and populations of willow flycatchers increased. In these sites 90% of the willow flycatcher's nests were found in native vegetation, only 10% were in mixed vegetation (native species and saltcedar) and few were in areas dominated by saltcedar. However, because willow flycatchers can and do breed in some locations within saltcedar habitat, it occasionally serves as vital habitat in the recovery of this species.

The San Pedro River Preserve was purchased by the Nature Conservancy to preserve habitat for this subspecies. NatureServe considers the subspecies Imperiled. North American beavers (Castor canadensis) are thought to play a critical role in widening riparian width, openings in dense vegetation, and retention of surface water through the willow flycatcher breeding season.

==== E. t. traillii (Audubon, 1828) ====
The eastern nominate subspecies of the willow flycatcher (E. t. traillii) was described by Audubon in 1828. It breeds from the eastern coast of the United States to the western Rocky Mountains.

== Description ==
Adults have brown-olive upperparts, darker on the wings and tail, with whitish underparts; they have an indistinct white eye ring, white wing bars and a small bill. The breast is washed with olive-gray. The upper part of the bill is gray; the lower part is orangish.

Standard Measurements
length	130–150 mm (5.2–6 in)
weight	13.5 g (0.48 oz)
wingspan	220 mm (8.5 in)
wing	68.7–75.6 mm (2.70–2.98 in)
tail	54–64.5 mm (2.13–2.54 in)
culmen	10.5–12.3 mm (0.41–0.48 in)
tarsus	15.5–18.0 mm (0.61–0.71 in)

== Distribution and habitat ==
Their breeding habitat is deciduous thickets, especially willows and often near water, across the United States and southern Canada. They make a cup nest in a vertical fork in a shrub or tree.

These neotropical birds migrate to Mexico and Central America, and in small numbers as far south as Ecuador in South America, often selecting winter habitat near water. Willow flycatchers travel approximately 1,500–8,000 km (930–4,970 mi) each way between wintering and breeding areas.

This bird's song is a sneezed fitz-bew. The call is a dry whit.

== Food resources ==
Willow flycatchers are generalist insectivores, and the insects which comprise their diet vary substantially across different habitats. For example, flies of the order Diptera made up the majority of adult willow flycatcher diets in Ontario, Canada, but only composed 10.6% of the diet of California flycatchers, who instead favor Lepidopterans, mayflies, and snakeflies. They are "sit-and-wait" predators, remaining on a perch near the top of a shrub and flying out to catch insects on the wing, but are also reported to glean insects off of leaves and stems.
