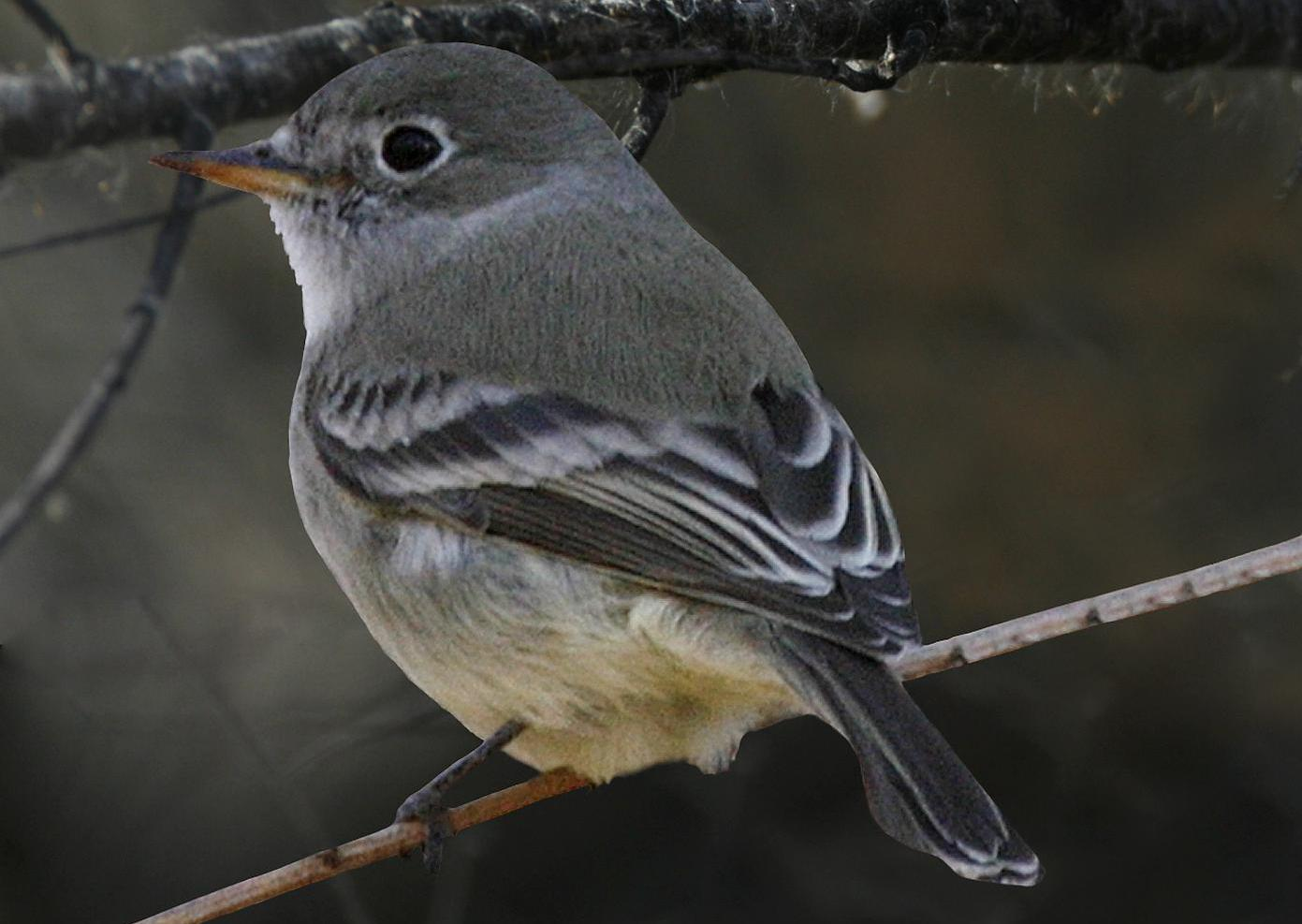

Conservation status
- Least Concern (IUCN 3.1)

Scientific classification
- Kingdom: Animalia
- Phylum: Chordata
- Class: Aves
- Order: Passeriformes
- Family: Tyrannidae
- Genus: Empidonax
- Species: E. wrightii

Binomial name
- Empidonax wrightii S.F. Baird, 1858
- Breeding Migration Nonbreeding

= American gray flycatcher =

Species of bird

The American gray flycatcher, American grey flycatcher, or just gray flycatcher (Empidonax wrightii) as it is known in North America, is a small, insectivorous passerine in the tyrant flycatcher family. It is common in the arid regions of western North America, especially the Great Basin. From sagebrush steppes to pinyon-juniper woodlands and ponderosa pine forests, this flycatcher forages for insects from shrubs or low tree branches.

The American gray flycatcher is one of the many species in the genus Empidonax. These species are very similar in appearance and behavior, and they are notoriously difficult to differentiate. The best characteristics for distinguishing these species are voice, breeding habitat, and range. The American gray flycatcher, however, can be identified by a unique behavior, its downward tail wag. Other Empidonax species typically exhibit a rapid upward tail flick.

== Description ==
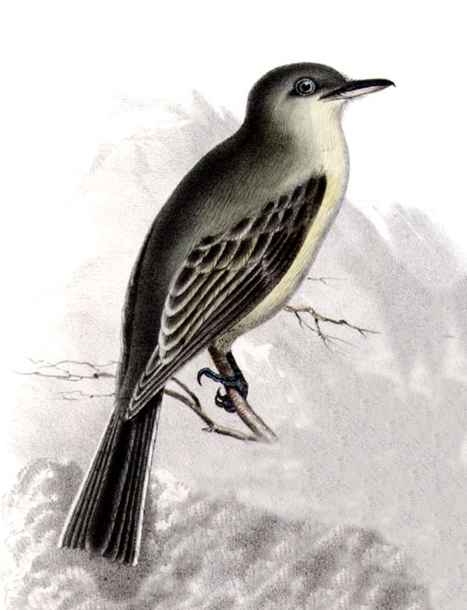

American gray flycatchers are small birds, but larger than most Empidonax flycatchers. A typical adult measures 15 cm (5.9 in) in length, 22 cm (8.7 in) in wingspan, and 12.5 g (0.44 oz) in mass.

Adults have pale gray upperparts, darker on the wings and tail, with a faint olive tinge after molting in fall. Underparts are whitish, but washed slightly with yellow in fresh plumage. They have white wing bars and an inconspicuous white eye ring. There is a pale supraloral band stretching above the base of the bill. Relative to other North American Empidonax flycatchers, the American gray flycatcher has a long, narrow bill, a long tail, and the mandible tends to be paler for more of its length.

Juveniles are similar in appearance to adults, but with stronger olive and yellow tones. Also, young birds have buffy wing bars and brownish breasts.

Only the male sings. The song is a strong, two syllable note described as chuwip or wilip. A weaker, higher-pitched teeap or seep is often inserted into the song. Both sexes give a dry pit or wit call. Females call often when foraging or collecting nest materials.

== Taxonomy ==
The American gray flycatcher is very similar morphologically to the American dusky flycatcher (Empidonax oberholseri), which has been problematic in taxonomy. When described as a species in 1889, the American gray flycatcher was named Empidonax griseus. This name was reduced to synonymy when it was discovered that the type specimen designated for the dusky flycatcher was in fact an American gray flycatcher. The name then in use for dusky flycatcher was Wright's flycatcher (E. wrightii), a name proposed in 1858. Because the name wrightii took precedence, it was applied to the American gray flycatcher, leaving the dusky flycatcher to be given a new name, E. oberholseri.

There are no recognized subspecies, and there is no geographic variation reported.

The IOC World Bird List uses the name American grey flycatcher for Empidonax wrightii to differentiate it from the African grey flycatcher. However, the American Ornithological Society (which covers North and Middle America) names it gray flycatcher.

== Distribution ==
The American gray flycatcher breeds from southernmost British Columbia through a narrow zone in central Washington to eastern Oregon and California. The range extends east across Nevada, southern Idaho, Utah, and northern Arizona to southwestern Wyoming, western Colorado, and northwestern New Mexico.

Depending on latitude, they arrive on breeding grounds mid-April to mid-May and leave between mid-August and mid-September. Migration between breeding and wintering grounds takes approximately seven weeks in both spring and autumn. Males usually arrive on breeding grounds one week prior to arrival of females.

The American gray flycatcher winters in Baja California Sur, southeastern Arizona, and central Sonora to central Oaxaca. Small numbers may winter in western Texas and southern California.

== Habitat ==
Breeding habitat can be shrubland, open woodland, or forest with bare understory. Although it is typically dominated by sagebrush (Artemisia species), common associations include bitterbrush (Purshia species), rabbitbrush (Chrysothamnus species, Ericameria nauseosus), mountain-mahogany (Cercocarpus ledifolius), juniper (Juniperus species), pinyon pine (Pinus species), and ponderosa pine (Pinus ponderosa).

During migration habitat is generally similar to breeding habitat, but riparian areas are often used. Thus, migrants may be found in willow (Salix species), oak (Quercus species), or mesquite (Prosopis species).

In winter the American gray flycatcher is found in "arid open and semiopen areas with scrub and scattered trees".

== Behavior ==
=== Diet ===
The diet presumably consists entirely of insects and other small invertebrates. Fruit may be eaten in winter, but that has not been confirmed.

Most prey is taken in flight or from the ground. A bird will wait on an open perch – usually on a shrub or low tree branch – and fly out to catch a passing insect. Less commonly, a hovering bird gleans prey from foliage or bark.

=== Reproduction ===
The American gray flycatcher is territorial during the breeding season. Males establish a territory and attract a female through vocalizations and displays. They appear to be monogamous, but extra-pair copulations may occur.

The nest is bulky and less compact than those of other Empidonax flycatchers. The female builds the nest (males rarely help) from various plant materials, especially grass stalks and strips of bark. The nest is usually lined with softer materials, such as wool, hair, feathers, or soft grasses. Nests may be placed in sagebrush, bitterbrush, junipers, or pines. Nest height depends in part on the height of the substrate (i.e., nests tend to be higher in taller trees) but is usually 1–6 m (3.3–19.7 ft) above ground. Most nests are placed in the crotch of a branch next to the trunk, but some are situated on larger branches away from the trunk.

Females lay one egg per day, with a final clutch size of three or four. The female incubates the eggs for about two weeks. The eggs, although laid on different days, usually hatch on the same day. The chicks are altricial and have little down when they hatch. Both parents feed the nestlings. Fledging occurs about 16 days after hatching.
