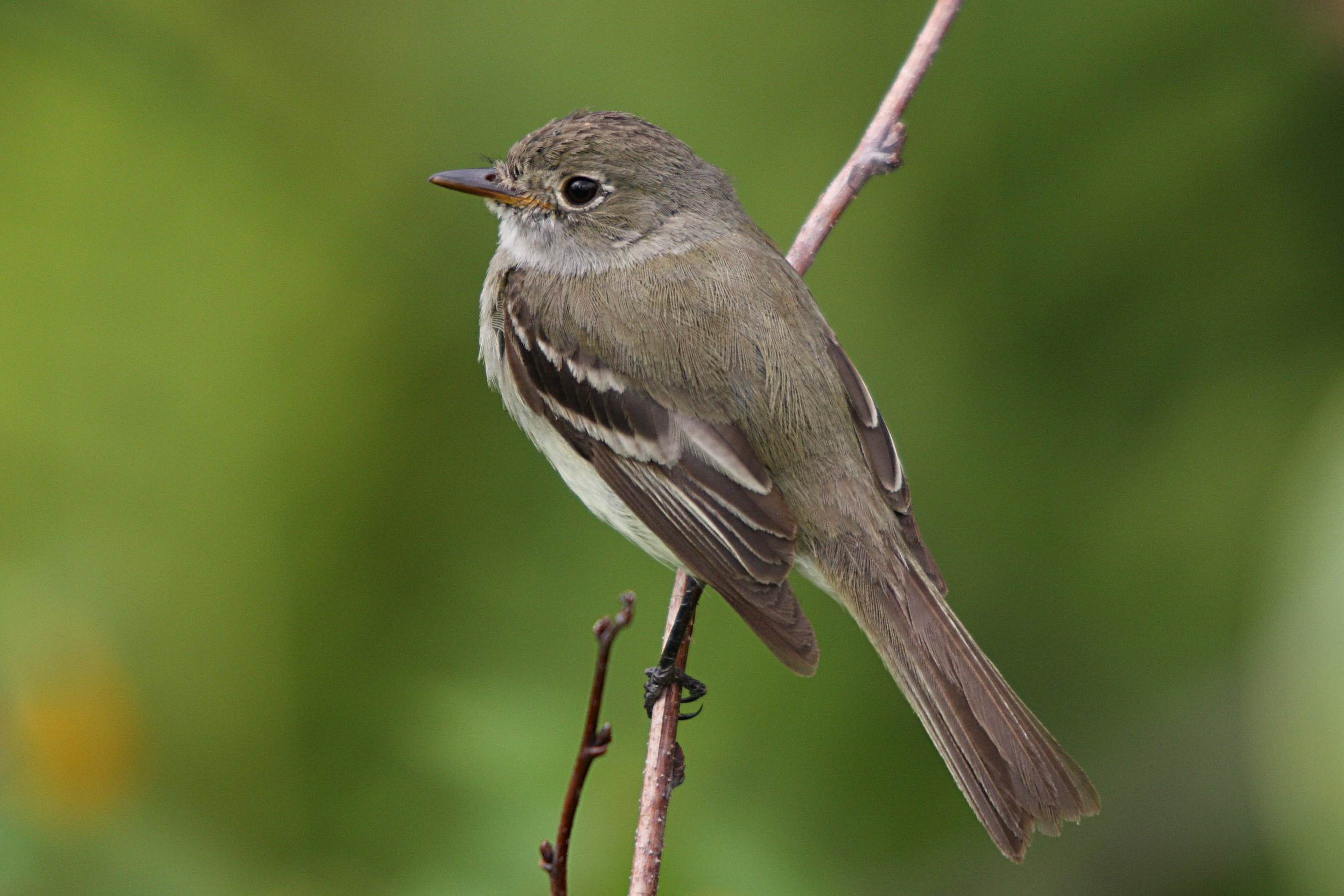

Conservation status
- Least Concern (IUCN 3.1)

Scientific classification
- Kingdom: Animalia
- Phylum: Chordata
- Class: Aves
- Order: Passeriformes
- Family: Tyrannidae
- Genus: Empidonax
- Species: E. alnorum

Binomial name
- Empidonax alnorum Brewster, 1895
- Breeding Migration Nonbreeding

= Alder flycatcher =

Alder Flycatcher

Species of bird

Song

The alder flycatcher (Empidonax alnorum) is a small insect-eating bird in the tyrant flycatcher family. The genus name Empidonax is from Ancient Greek empis, "gnat", and anax, "master". The specific alnorum is Latin and means "of the alders".

== Description ==
E. alnorum is one of the larger Empidonax species, attaining a length of 13–17 cm (5.1–6.7 in), and a weight of 12–14 g (0.42–0.49 oz). The wingspan ranges from 21–24 cm (8.3–9.4 in). The upperparts of E. alnorum are dull greenish-olive. The crown is a slightly darker olive-green than the back. The throat is white, with a darker breast band. Thin white rings surround the eyes. The bill is wide and moderate in length, with pinkish or yellow-orange lower mandible and black upper mandible. Wings are generally black, with white wing bars and white edges of the innermost secondaries (tertials). Juveniles have brownish upperparts, yellow underparts, and yellowish brown or buff wingbars.

E. alnorum is similar in appearance to the eastern wood pewee (Contopus virens) and the eastern phoebe (Sayornis phoebe), as well as the nearly identical willow flycatcher (Empidonax traillii) but E. alnorum can be distinguished by its smaller size and upward tail flicking behavior.

Birds in the genus Empidonax are notoriously hard to identify. Novel approaches to identification have been employed to try and increase the accuracy of species identification of mist-netted individuals, such as using ratios of and differences between the measured lengths of various body parts, including wings and beaks. Vocalizations are often relied upon for identification to species in the field when birds cannot be manipulated by hand. The ratio of the lengths of the primary feathers is a useful distinction with birds in the hand or on good quality profile photographs.

== Taxonomy ==
The alder flycatcher is sibling species with the willow flycatcher (E. trailli). The two species were grouped together as one species, the Traill's flycatcher, until 1973, when differences in vocalizations and habitat use lead to their acknowledgement as distinct species, which has since been supported by genetic data. A study analyzing the genetic makeup of 12 Empidonax species found that the Alder and Willow Flycatcher are each other's closest relatives. The genus Empidonax is closely related to the pewee genus (Contopus), and a hybrid of the two genera was reported to have been caught in Idaho.

== Habitat and distribution ==
The summer breeding range of the species covers most of Canada and Alaska, descending to a southernmost point in the northeastern United States. In autumn, E. alnorum migrates south through the eastern United States, Mexico and Central America, wintering in the western range of South America.

In the summer breeding season, E. alnorum occupies wet, dense, shrubby thickets of young (typically 3–8 years old) alder (Alnus sp.), maple (Acer sp.), and birch (Betula sp.), from sea level up to 1,300 m (4,300 ft). During migration, the species occupies humid and semi-arid habitats, including forest edges and fields at elevations up to 2,500 m (8,200 ft). Early successional scrubby vegetation or woodland edges are preferred habitats in winter, particularly those near water and below 1,100 m (3,600 ft).

== Behavior ==
=== Vocalizations ===
The vocalizations of the alder flycatcher are very useful for its identification in the field. The song is a distinct "fee-bee-o"; birds have been observed to throw their heads back and shake their tails while singing. There are a variety of calls made, the most common of which is a "pit" sound produced when foraging. Other calls include those associated with aggressive or territorial behavior, including "double-peak", "zwee-oo", and "wee-oo" calls, and those linked with excitement, such as a "kitter" call.

=== Diet ===
The diet is composed primarily of insects such as those from the Hymenoptera (sawflies, bees, wasps and ants), Coleoptera (beetles), Diptera (flies), Lepidoptera (butterflies and moths) and Orthoptera (locusts, grasshoppers and crickets) families. Insects are captured during flight or gleaned from the foliage of trees. In the winter, some birds will include fruit and seeds in their diet.

=== Reproduction ===
The alder flycatcher breeds in wet thickets of maple, alder and birch. Nests are positioned low in bushes within shrubby thickets, and are cup-shaped, built loosely of vegetative materials such as grass, weeds, pieces of bark, and small twigs. Strips of grass or bark can often be seen dangling from the bottom of the nest, and the inside is lined with soft materials such as plant down. Females primarily engage in nest building activities.

Male E. alnorum vocalize to defend their breeding territory. As the species has not been extensively studied, courtship behavior is uncertain, but is believed to involve males chasing females through the trees.

Three or four eggs are laid per breeding season; they are creamy-white or buff in color and speckled with dark markings near the larger end of the egg. The female incubates the eggs for 12–14 days. Hatchlings are altricial and covered with tiny spots of olive-brown down. Both the male and female are involved in caring for the young. Juveniles take their first flight around 13–14 days of age.

== Conservation status ==
E. alnorum is a species of least concern according to the IUCN Redlist. Population numbers are stable in the United States, but have declined in Canada by approximately 44% in the period 1966–2014. The species has a rating of 9 out of 20 on the Continental Concern Score, and is a U.S.-Canada Stewardship species.
