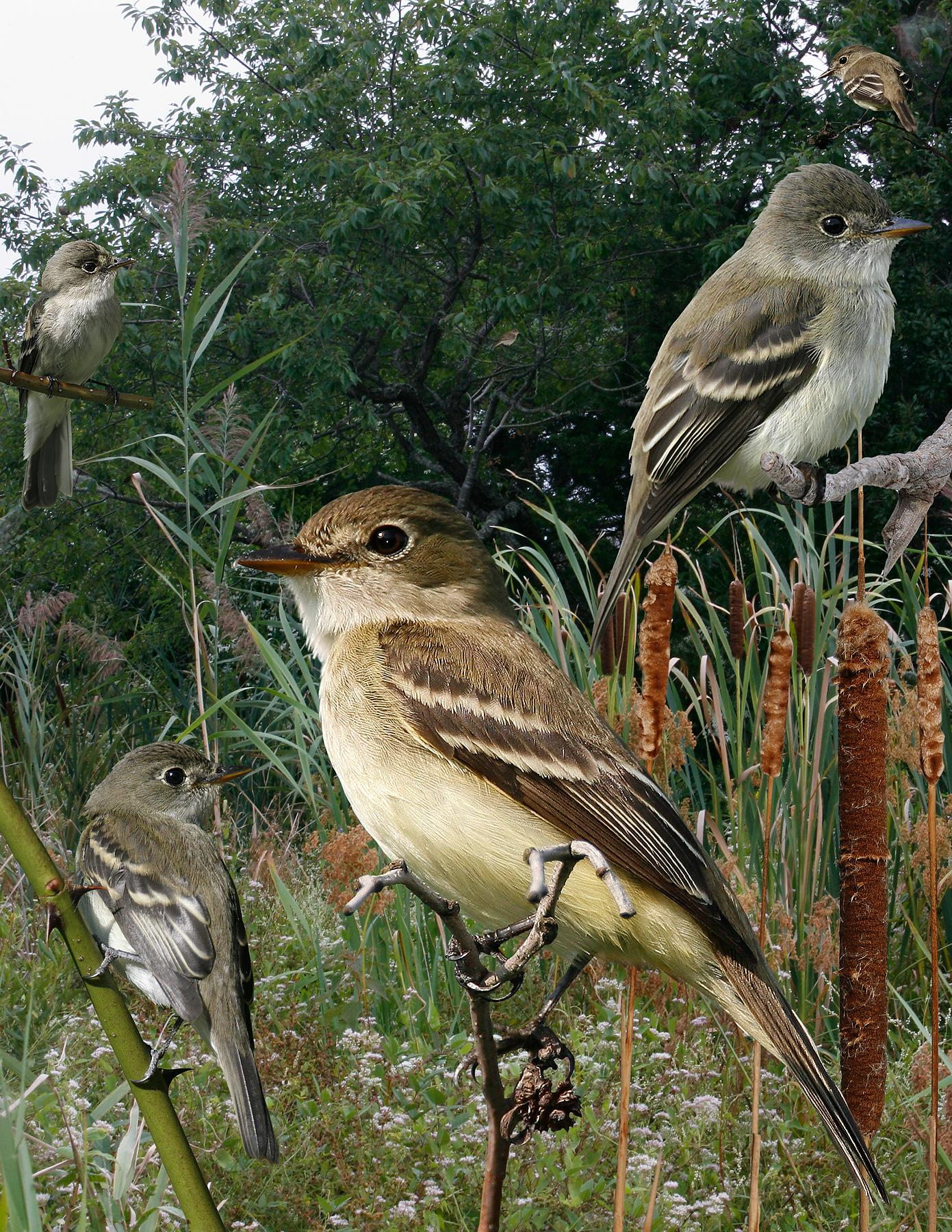
- Alder flycatchers, Empidonax alnorum

Scientific classification
- Kingdom: Animalia
- Phylum: Chordata
- Class: Aves
- Order: Passeriformes
- Family: Tyrannidae
- Genus: Empidonax; Cabanis, 1855

Type species
- Empidonax pusillus Cabanis, 1855=Platyrhynchos virescens Vieillot, 1818

Species
- See text

= Empidonax =

Genus of birds

The genus Empidonax is a group of small insect-eating passerine birds in the tyrant flycatcher family, the Tyrannidae that are found in North and South America.

== Taxonomy ==
The genus Empidonax was introduced in 1855 by the German ornithologist Jean Cabanis to accommodate a single species, Empidonax pusillus. This name is now considered to be a junior synonym of Platyrhynchos virescens that had been introduced in 1818 by Louis Pierre Vieillot for the Acadian flycatcher. The genus name combines the Ancient Greek εμπις/empis, εμπιδος/empidos meaning "gnat" or "mosquito" with αναξ/anax, ανακτος/anaktos meaning "lord" or "master". A large molecular phylogenetic study of the tyrant flycatcher family published in 2020 found that Empidonax was sister to the genus Sayornis containing the three phoebes.

Most of these birds are very similar in plumage: olive on the upper parts with light underparts, eye rings and wing bars. In the nesting season they may be distinguished by range, habitat and call; in other situations, particularly on migration and in winter, it may not be possible to be sure of specific identification.

Empidonax flycatchers often flick their wings and tails rapidly.

Euler's flycatcher, Lathrotriccus euleri and gray-breasted flycatcher, Lathrotriccus griseipectus were formerly placed in Empidonax, but differ anatomically and biochemically and are now placed in the genus Lathrotriccus.

== Species ==
The genus contains 14 species:

Image	Scientific name	Common name	Distribution
	Empidonax flaviventris	Yellow-bellied flycatcher	North America, Mexico and Central America
	Empidonax virescens	Acadian flycatcher	eastern United States and southwestern Ontario, eastern Mexico and the Caribbean to southern Central America and the very northwest of South America in Colombia, western Venezuela, and Ecuador
	Empidonax alnorum	Alder flycatcher	Canada and Alaska, descending to a southernmost point in the northeastern United States
	Empidonax traillii	Willow flycatcher	United States and southern Canada
	Empidonax albigularis	White-throated flycatcher	Belize, Costa Rica, El Salvador, Guatemala, Honduras, Mexico, Nicaragua, and Panama.
	Empidonax minimus	Least flycatcher	eastern North America
	Empidonax hammondii	Hammond's flycatcher	western United States, Alaska and Canada
	Empidonax wrightii	American grey flycatcher	western North America, especially the Great Basin.
	Empidonax oberholseri	American dusky flycatcher	southern Arizona and Mexico
	Empidonax affinis	Pine flycatcher	Mexico and southwestern Guatemala.
	Empidonax difficilis	Western flycatcher	western North America, including the Pacific Ocean and the southern Gulf of California to Mexico
	Empidonax flavescens	Yellowish flycatcher	southeastern Mexico south to western Panama.
	Empidonax fulvifrons	Buff-breasted flycatcher	United States through Mexico to southern Honduras.
	Empidonax atriceps	Black-capped flycatcher	Costa Rica and western Panama.
