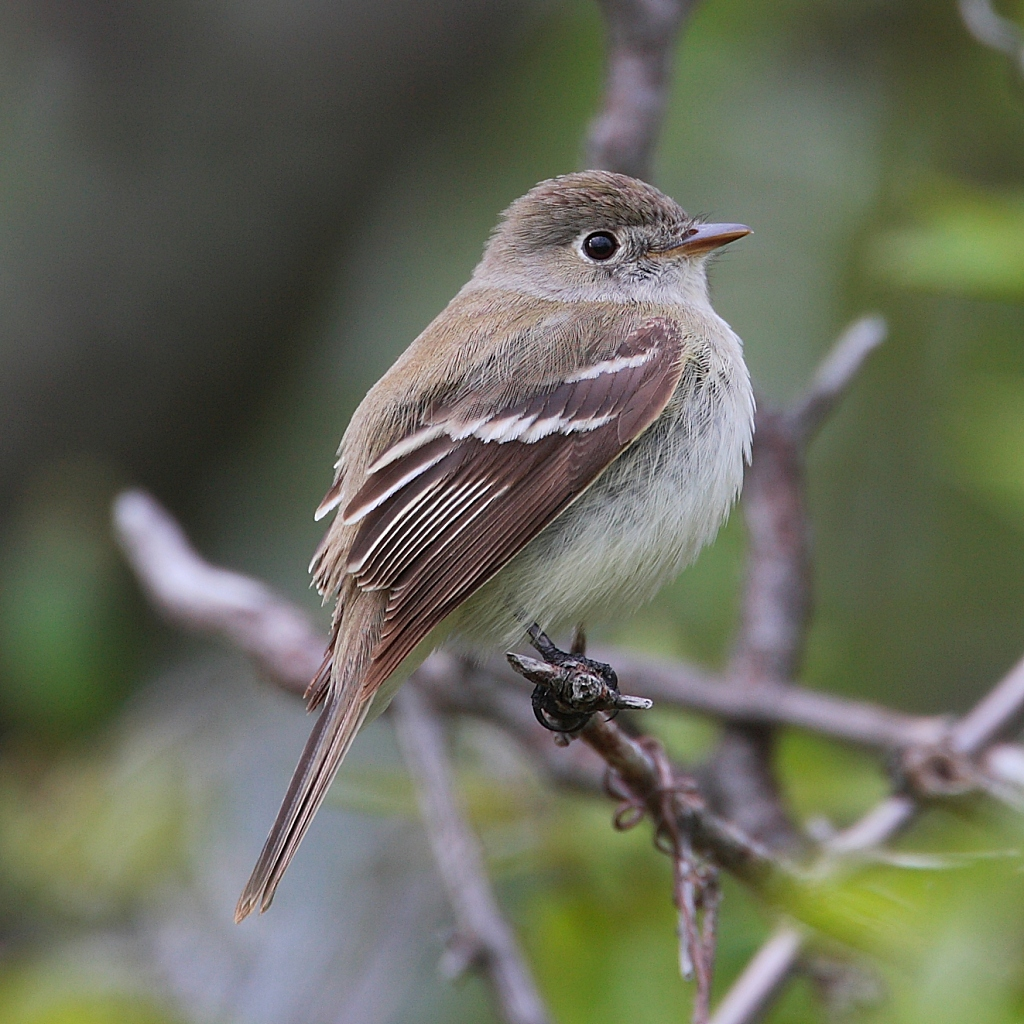

Conservation status
- Least Concern (IUCN 3.1)

Scientific classification
- Kingdom: Animalia
- Phylum: Chordata
- Class: Aves
- Order: Passeriformes
- Family: Tyrannidae
- Genus: Empidonax
- Species: E. minimus

Binomial name
- Empidonax minimus (Baird, WM & S.F. Baird, 1843)
- Breeding Migration Non-breeding

= Least flycatcher =

Species of bird

The least flycatcher (Empidonax minimus) (also called chebec, or chebecker, after the sound it makes) is a small insect-eating bird. It is the smallest Empidonax flycatcher in eastern North America.

== Taxonomy ==
The closest relative to the least flycatcher was long thought to be the Hammond's flycatcher based on similarities in their songs and appearances. However, mitochondrial DNA analysis has revealed that the least flycatcher diverges significantly from its congeners and does not possess any sister taxa.

== Description ==
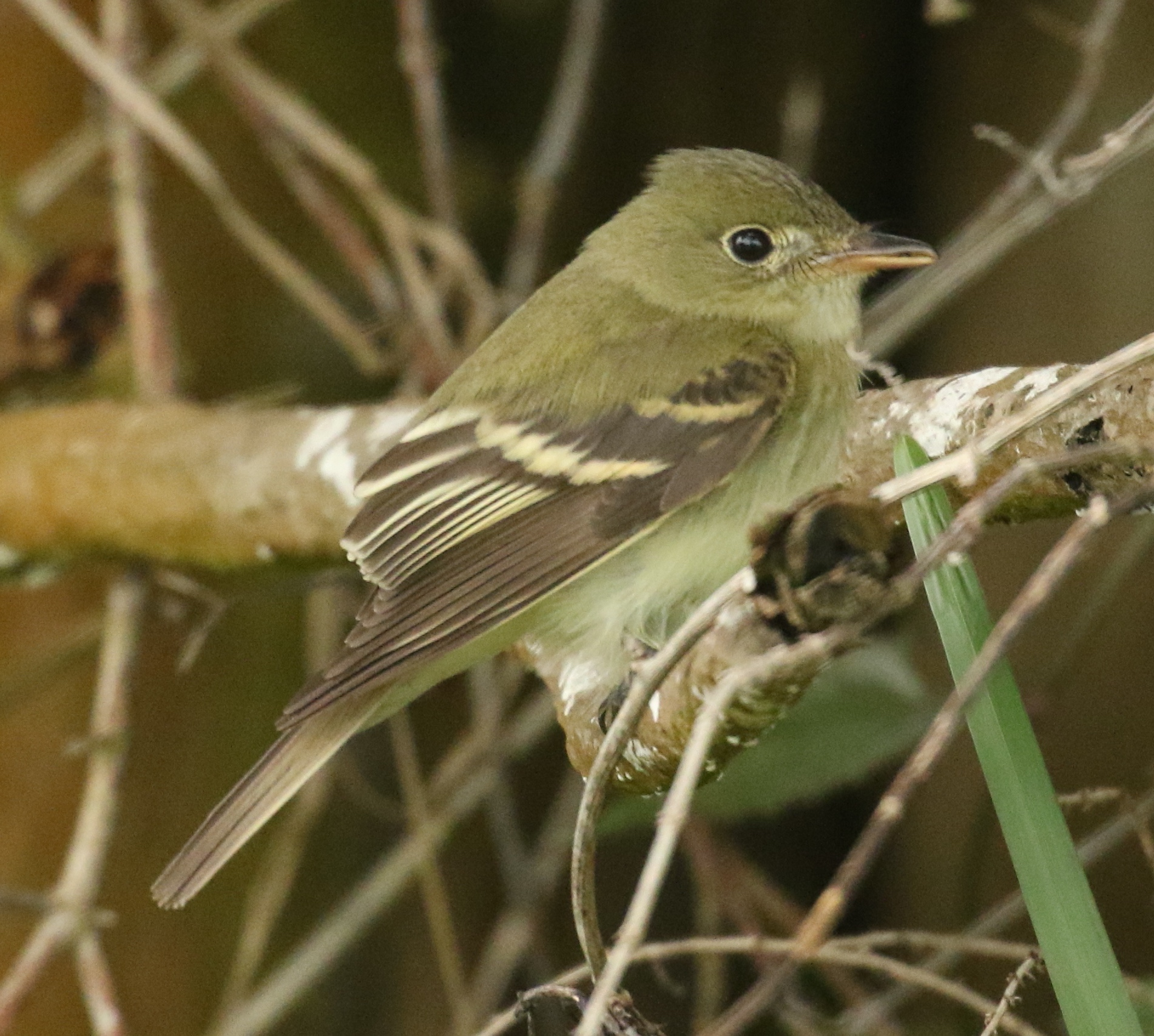
South Padre Island - Texas

The least flycatcher is hard to distinguish from the other birds of its genus. The bird is one of the smallest of the genus Empidonax, measuring 12 to 14 cm in height with a wingspan of 19 to 22 cm and weighing approximately 10.3 g. Its plumage is dull olive-gray on its back and whitish on its belly, notably brighter than the other Empidonax birds. The least flycatcher's wings are lined with two white bars, and white rings contour its eyes. Its beak is short and the lower mandible is yellowish. The juveniles look similar to the adults except that their wing bars are slightly darker, with tawny/olive hues. Because other flycatchers also have those field marks, the best way to identify the least flycatcher is by its call and habitat.

== Distribution and habitat ==
The least flycatcher inhabits the Eastern Rockies of Canada, and the Central-North and Northeastern United-States. During winter, they migrate to Central America and establish themselves from Mexico to Panama.

The least flycatcher lives in aspen clusters, orchards, shade trees and open woods. They breed in deciduous or mixed forests and occasionally in coniferous groves. They tend to prefer breeding sites near clearing or edges but can also nest in dry woods. They spend the winter in Central America where they nest in forest edges and second growth.

The least flycatcher also made its way in the open country. They often live in villages or city parks, nesting in shade trees and orchards, or along rural roads and forest edges.

== Behaviour: vocalization, diet and reproduction ==
=== Vocalization ===
Call

The vocalization of the least flycatcher is often characterized as being dry and sounding like a piercing «che-bec» pushed with strength, the second syllable being louder than the first. During the hottest days of the summer, they often call incessantly.

Singing is essential to the least flycatcher to establish and defend their territory. While the female remains quietly in the nest, the male sings from several perches some distance away from the nest, and a few meters above the level of the nest. From there, he sings the Che-bec repeatedly and rapidly during the morning (about 60 times per minute), losing some speed and regularity throughout the day. All of the males in a same area seem to sing in unison. This singing fervor gradually decreases throughout the summer, as the breeding cycle reaches an end.

The female sings rarely. She instead uses a call-note that Macqueen (1950) describes as sounding like «Chweep». She sometimes calls while feeding her nestling, or to her partner when he leaves and returns to the nest. She also uses her chweep-note in outbursts when defending her nest.

=== Diet ===
The least flycatcher, as its name indicates, feeds on flies but includes many other items in its diet. They mainly eat insects such as many small wasps, winged ants, beetles, caterpillars, midges, a few true bugs, grasshoppers, spiders and other small invertebrates. They also occasionally eat berries.

To forage, the least flycatcher mainly catches its insects mid-air, but they also catch some insects from the vegetation. When foraging, the bird watches from a perch and flies out to catch the insects that pass by. The Least flycatcher is considered a slow searcher in comparison to other birds, switching perch around 10 times/minute and frequently turning around on its perch to get a 360° view. Least flycatchers rarely glean but hover extensively in comparison to its congeners. Those perches are mainly dead twigs of the bottom part of a tree located in opened patches of the forest. In short, Robinson and Holmes (1982) determined that the least flycatcher attacks 81.1% of their preys by hovering, 9.6% by hawking, 6.2% by flush-chasing and 3.1% by gleaning.

=== Reproduction ===
The least flycatcher breeds in spring in close quarters with other pairs of its species. The proximity of neighbors even appears to be more important than habitat quality when the bird is selecting its breeding site. The advantage that could explain such a behavior remains unclear and has been the subject of many studies. Some of the hypothesis the scholars explored include: clustering to take advantage of heterogeneous resources, to deter predators, or to keep away other species with similar resource requirements.

The courtship behavior of the least flycatcher remains largely unknown but it is thought to involve the male chasing the female through trees. The males are aggressive and sing incessantly until pairs form. Once pairs form, the female starts building their nest on either the forks of small trees like maples, birches, or ashes, or on the top of a large branch. The average height of the nest is 12 to 25 inches above the ground, but can vary from 2 to 65 inches depending on the habitat. The female builds the nest by weaving fine pieces of grass, strips of bark, twigs, lichen, spider and caterpillar webs, animal hairs and feathers, and other plant-derived materials together to form a tidy cup, a process that takes her about five days.

The female least flycatcher typically lays three to five creamy-white colored eggs, with a strong tendency towards four. The female incubates the eggs for a period of 13 to 16 days while the male remains in the area and occasionally feeds her. The eggs hatch together in June over a period of one to three days. Once the eggs hatch, both parents bring food to their newborns. The nestlings fly for the first time at the age of 12 to 17 days. They typically remain being fed by their parents for another 2 to 3 weeks.

=== Territoriality ===
The couple spends most of its time in their chosen breeding site. Their average defended territory size is 0.18 acres (8036.8 feet square), with an average distance between congener's nests of 175 feet. Both parents become particularly aggressive and territorial to both intra- and heterospecific intruders. If another least flycatcher intrudes their territory, the resident male quickly reacts, uttering a sharp note and adopting a threat-display. In its threat-display, the male attempts to look bigger by "fluffing out its breast feathers, raising its chest, extending, vibrating and bending the wings, spreading and flicking the tail up and down, and crouching". This display lasts only a second or two before the male flies off to chase the trespasser away. If the intruder is too persistent, the resident male engages in a fight and usually wins.

Females can also engage in territorial defenses in certain occasions. If the trespasser comes in a radius of about 20 feet surrounding her nest, the female reacts. If her partner is absent, she flies off to chase the intruder and attacks if necessary. She can also work in tandem with her partner to defend their territory in scenarios where there are more than one intruder at a time. In that case, they both cooperate and chase them away, although the male is always first to react.

== Migration ==
Least flycatchers' age and sex groups migrate at different intervals. In Fall, adult males leave the breeding ground first, followed by adult females about a week later. The younger ones only join the rest of the group a month later. Fall migration occurs in July and early August, peaking in late-August.

In the Fall migration, it has been reported that populations living in the west first migrate east before heading south. From the East, they then fly down to the Tropics. A few of them establish themselves for the winter in southern Florida, but most of them choose to spend their winter on the coasts of Central America. Once in that region, they inhabit wooded ravines of the Pacific slope or the dense bushes and wooded edges habitats of the Caribbean side.

The least flycatcher leaves its wintering ground relatively early in comparison to other birds, arriving back north in late April to mid-May. It is thought that they can afford to arrive so early because they can subsist on small-sized insects which are out early in spring. They might also arrive early because of their highly competitive breeding site selection – a product of their habit to breed in clustered distribution.

The least flycatcher spends its breeding season in southern Yukon to central Quebec and Maritime Provinces, in Wyoming Indiana, New Jersey and in the mountains of North Carolina. The breeding season only last about 64 days, after which they return south in the Tropics.

The adult least flycatcher molts after migrating to its wintering ground, which differs from most other passerines. The juveniles, on the other hand, molt prior and throughout their Fall migration. The reason why the molt of the adults is delayed remains unclear, but might be due to the highly competitive site selection of winter habitat, where the first to arrive are the first to be served.
