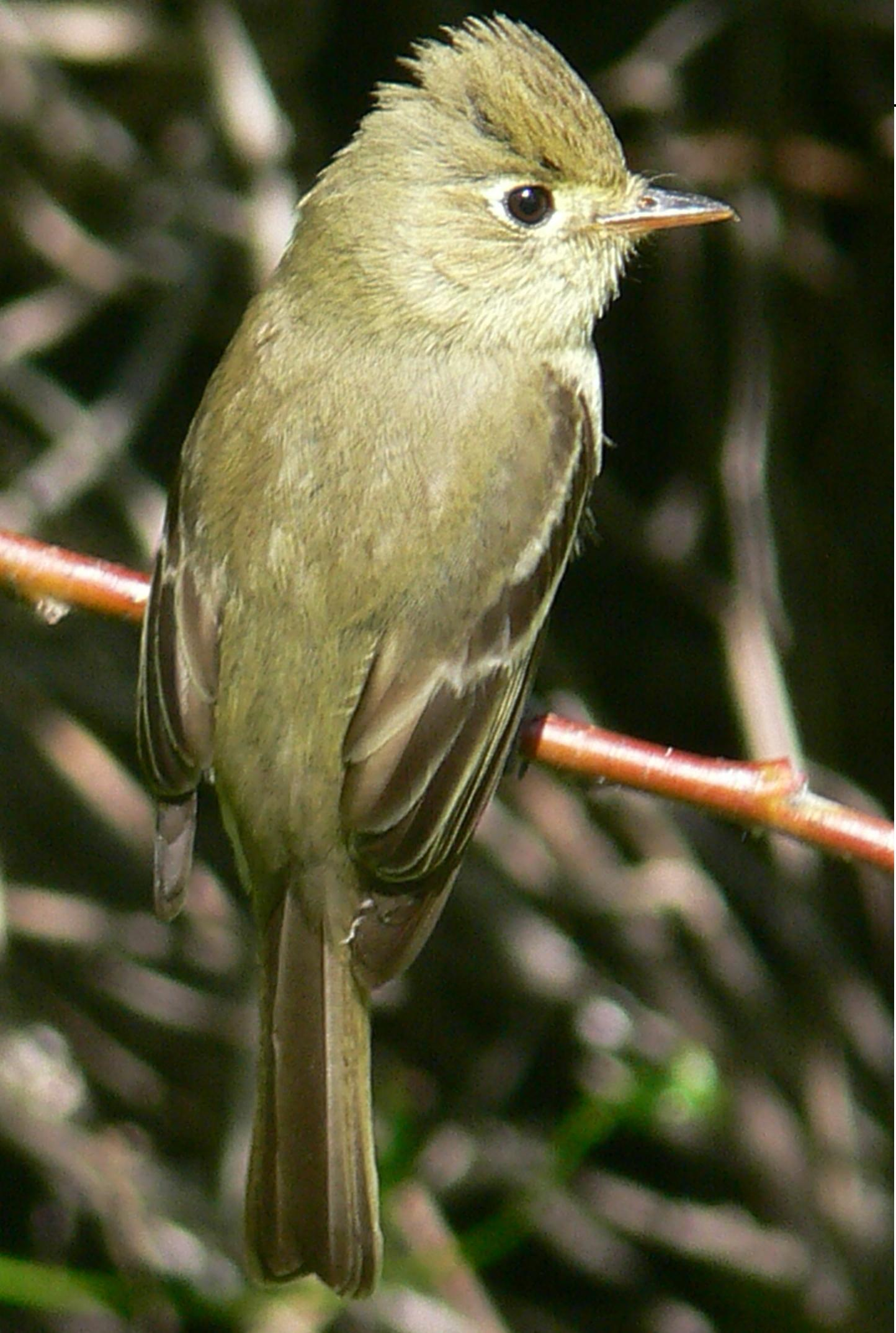

Conservation status
- Least Concern (IUCN 3.1)

Scientific classification
- Kingdom: Animalia
- Phylum: Chordata
- Class: Aves
- Order: Passeriformes
- Family: Tyrannidae
- Genus: Empidonax
- Species: E. difficilis

Binomial name
- Empidonax difficilis Baird, 1858

Synonyms
- Empidonax occidentalis Nelson, 1897

= Western flycatcher =

Species of bird

The western flycatcher (Empidonax difficilis) is a small insectivorous bird in the family Tyrannidae. It is native to western North America, where it breeds in the Rocky Mountains and Pacific Coast forests and mountain ranges from California to Alaska and south to central Mexico; northern populations migrate south to Mexico for the winter.

== Taxonomy ==
The western flycatcher was recognized as a single species until 1989, when the American Ornithologists' Union split it into two different species: the Pacific-slope flycatcher (E. difficilis) of coastal western North America and parts of the western Rocky Mountains, and the Cordilleran flycatcher (E. occidentalis) of the interior Rocky Mountains, with both species wintering in Mexico. Both species looked virtually identical to one another, with the split being based on differing breeding habitats and apparent differences in songs and calls. The split was recognized until 2023, when the American Ornithologists' Union and International Ornithological Congress again lumped both species due to a lack of consistent vocal, genetic, morphological differences and extensive hybridization across much of their range.

=== Subspecies ===
There are five subspecies recognized:

- E. d. difficilis, from southeastern Alaska south to the Sierra San Pedro Mártir of Baja California, Mexico
- E. d. insulicola, the Channel Islands of southern California
- E. d. cineritius, mountains of southern Baja California Sur, Mexico
- E. d. hellmayri, Breeds in the interior Rockies from Canada south to northern Mexico, winters in central and southern Mexico
- E. d. occidentalis, the Sierra Madre del Sur of Guerrero and southern Oaxaca, Mexico

The latter two subspecies were previously thought to comprise the "Cordilleran flycatcher".

== Description ==
Position note of Cordilleran flycatcher
A position note from a Cordilleran flycatcher in the Black Hills of South Dakota

Adults have olive-gray upperparts, darker on the wings and tail, with yellowish underparts; they have a conspicuous teardrop-shaped white eye ring, white wing bars, a small bill and a short tail. It differs only subtly from most Empidonax flycatchers in North America, but its breeding habitat and call are different. Many species of this genus look closely alike. The best ways to distinguish species are by voice, by breeding habitat, and by range.

DNA testing in 2014 confirmed a new field mark, involving the extent of buffy edging on the secondaries, to reliably distinguish this species from the yellow-bellied flycatchers.

The song includes notes represented as pseet, ptsick, seet usually sung rapidly together. In Pacific birds, the ptsick or ptik note has the first syllable higher-pitched than the second—this was previously seen as the only difference between their calls and those of the "Cordilleran" flycatcher (Sibley 2000). The male's typical position call is a loud and distinctive pit pete or tse-seet, but some give a "rising tsweep" or a "slurred tseeweep".

== Distribution ==
These birds migrate to Mexico for the winter, where the Mexican central-southern birds are resident. The non-resident birds are on the western coast from Jalisco northwards, and then to inland regions, in a corridor strip on the western flank of the Sierra Madre Occidental.

== Habitat ==
The western flycatcher inhabits either coniferous or deciduous forests. In its range it enters mixed woods, Douglas fir forests, redwood forests, pine-oak forests, and many other wooded environments including riparian woodlands. As of November 2019, there has been one case of these West Coast birds showing up on the East Coast, in Palmyra, New Jersey. The preferred breeding habitat is usually near running water. They make a cup nest on a fork in a tree, usually low in a horizontal branch. Females usually lay two to five eggs.

== Diet ==
As a flycatcher it will wait on a perch and when it sees a flying insect it will fly out to catch it in flight (hawking), and will also pluck insects from foliage while hovering (gleaning). They also enter swarms of gnats or mosquitoes. They fulfill an important role in keeping insect populations in check, particularly mosquitoes, and they also eat caterpillars and spiders.
