= House wren =

The house wren complex has been split into eight species:

- Northern house wren, Troglodytes aedon
- Southern house wren, Troglodytes musculus
- Cozumel wren, Troglodytes beani
- Kalinago wren, Troglodytes martinicensis
- St. Lucia wren, Troglodytes mesoleucus
- St. Vincent wren, Troglodytes musicus
- Grenada wren, Troglodytes grenadensis
- Cobb's wren, Troglodytes cobbi
