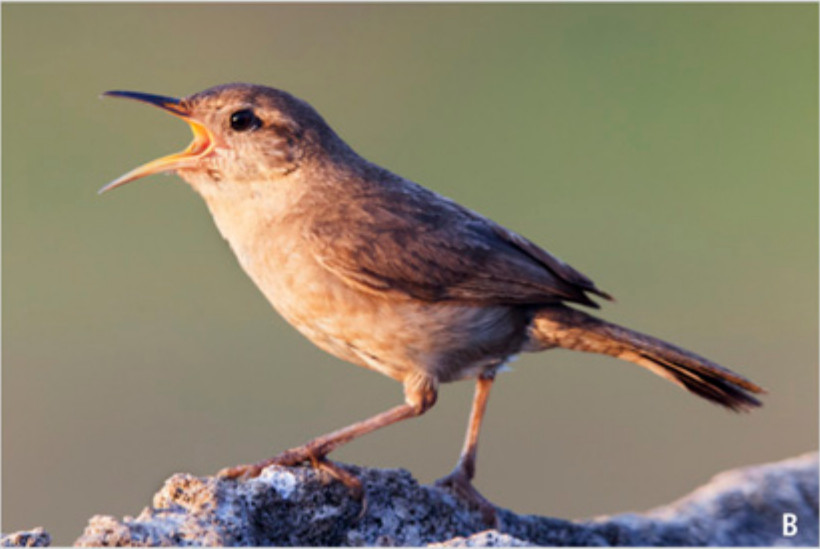
- Troglodytes tanneri

Conservation status
- Vulnerable (IUCN 3.1)

Scientific classification
- Kingdom: Animalia
- Phylum: Chordata
- Class: Aves
- Order: Passeriformes
- Family: Troglodytidae
- Genus: Troglodytes
- Species: T. tanneri

Binomial name
- Troglodytes tanneri Townsend, CH, 1890

= Clarión wren =

Species of bird

The Clarión wren (Troglodytes tanneri) is a species of bird in the family Troglodytidae. The species is endemic to Clarión Island off Pacific Mexico.

== Etymology ==
The specific name, tanneri, is in honor of United States Navy officer Zera Luther Tanner, commander of the research vessel USS Albatross.

== Description ==
The Clarión wren looks much like a house wren but is larger with a prominently longer bill, somewhat approaching the Carolina wren in form.

== Habitat ==
The natural habitats of the Clarión wren are the less arid patches of shrubland, notably thickets of Ipomoea halierca morning glory. It also appears to occur in the garrison buildings and garden at Sulfur Bay, but usually avoids the rocky shores and other exposed areas. In dense undergrowth, territories are some 10 meters (30–40 ft) in diameter.

== Reproduction ==
In late March 1953, Clarión wren males were found to be singing and threatening intruding competitors. Egg laying takes place between mid-March and mid-April. The eggs are similar to those of the house wren, but larger and more elongated. They measure approximately 20 x 14 mm (0.79 x 0.55 in) and also are colored basically like those of house wrens but with fewer and crisper markings noticeably denser at the blunt end.
