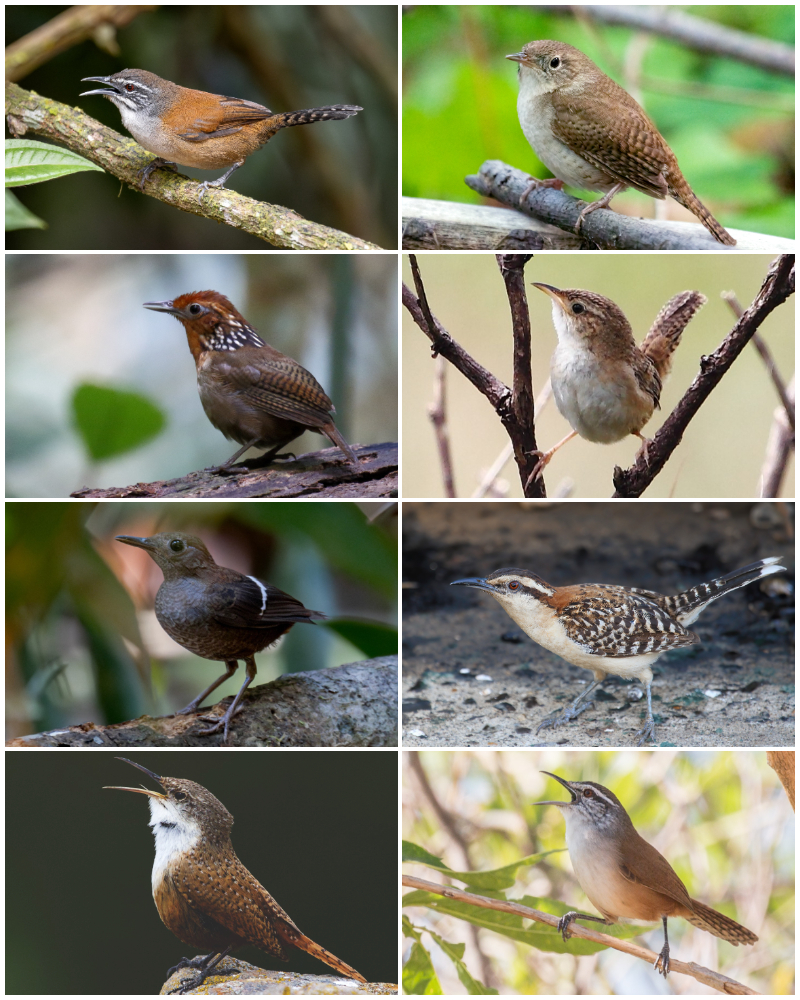
- Diversity of Troglodytidae

Scientific classification
- Kingdom: Animalia
- Phylum: Chordata
- Class: Aves
- Order: Passeriformes
- Superfamily: Certhioidea
- Family: Troglodytidae; Swainson, 1832

Genera and species
- See text

Audio
- Eurasian wren recorded in Speyside, Scotland

= Wren =

Wrens

Family of birds

Wrens are a family, Troglodytidae, of small brown passerine birds. The family includes 97 species and is divided into 19 genera. All species are restricted to the New World except for the Eurasian wren that is widely distributed in the Old World. In Anglophone regions, the Eurasian wren is commonly known simply as the "wren", as it is the originator of the name. The name wren has been applied to other, unrelated birds, particularly the New Zealand wrens (Acanthisittidae) and the Australian wrens (Maluridae).

Most wrens are visually inconspicuous though they have loud and often complex songs. Exceptions include the relatively large members of the genus Campylorhynchus, which can be quite bold in their behaviour. Wrens have short wings that are barred in most species, and they often hold their tails upright. Wrens are primarily insectivorous, eating insects, spiders and other small invertebrates, but many species also eat vegetable matter and some eat small frogs and lizards.

== Etymology and usage ==
The English name "wren" derives from Middle English: wrenne and Old English: wrænna, attested (as wernnaa) very early, in an eighth-century gloss. It is cognate to Old High German: wrendo, wrendilo, and Icelandic: rindill (the latter two including an additional diminutive -ilan suffix). The Icelandic name is attested in Old Icelandic (Eddaic) as rindilþvari. This points to a Common Germanic name wrandjan-, but the further etymology of the name is unknown.

The wren was also known as the kuningilin ('kinglet') in Old High German, a name associated with the fable of the election of the "king of birds". The bird that could fly to the highest altitude would be made king. The eagle outflew all other birds, but he was beaten by a small bird that had hidden in his plumage. This fable was already known to Aristotle (Historia Animalium 9.11) and Pliny (Natural History 10.95), and was taken up by medieval authors such as Johann Geiler von Kaisersberg, but it most likely originally concerned kinglets (Regulus, such as the goldcrest) and was apparently motivated by the yellow "crown" sported by these birds (a point noted already by Ludwig Uhland). The confusion stemmed in part from the similarity and consequent interchangeability of the Ancient Greek words for the wren (βασιλεύς basileus, 'king') and the crest (βασιλίσκος basiliskos, 'kinglet'), and the legend's reference to the "smallest of birds" becoming king likely led the title to be transferred to the equally tiny wren. In modern German, the name of the bird is Zaunkönig ('king of the fence (or hedge)') and in Dutch, the name is winterkoning ('king of winter').

The family name Troglodytidae is derived from troglodyte, which means 'cave-dweller'. Wrens get their scientific name from the tendency of some species to forage in dark crevices.

The name "wren" is also ascribed to other families of passerine birds throughout the world. In Europe, kinglets are occasionally known as "wrens", with the common firecrest and goldcrest known as the "fire-crested wren" and "golden-crested wren", respectively.

The 27 Australasian "wren" species in the family Maluridae are unrelated, as are the New Zealand wrens in the family Acanthisittidae, the antbirds in the family Thamnophilidae, and the Old World babblers of the family Timaliidae.

== Description ==
Wrens are medium-small to very small birds. The Eurasian wren is among the smallest birds in its range, while the smaller species from the Americas are among the smallest passerines in that part of the world. They range in size from the white-bellied wren, which averages under 10 cm (3.9 in) and 9 g (0.32 oz), to the giant wren, which averages about 22 cm (8.7 in) and weighs almost 50 g (1.8 oz). The dominating colors of their plumage are generally drab, composed of gray, brown, black, and white, and most species show some barring, especially on the tail or wings. No sexual dimorphism is seen in the plumage of wrens, and little difference exists between young birds and adults. All have fairly long, straight to marginally decurved (downward-curving) bills.

Wrens have loud and often complex songs, sometimes given in duet by a pair. The songs of members of the genera Cyphorhinus and Microcerculus have been considered especially pleasant to the human ear, leading to common names such as song wren, musician wren, flutist wren, and southern nightingale-wren.

== Distribution and habitat ==
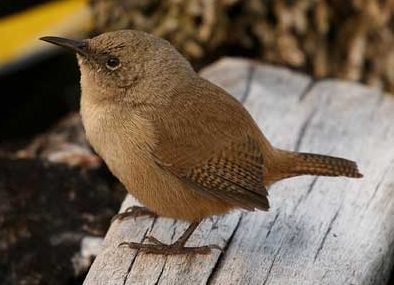
Cobb's wren is an insular endemic, restricted to the Falkland Islands

Wrens are principally a New World family, distributed from Alaska and Canada to southern Argentina, with the greatest species richness in the Neotropics. As suggested by its name, the Eurasian wren is the only species of wren found outside the Americas, as restricted to Europe, Asia, and northern Africa (it was formerly considered conspecific with the winter wren and Pacific wren of North America). The insular species include the Clarión wren and Socorro wren from the Revillagigedo Islands in the Pacific Ocean, and Cobb's wren in the Falkland Islands, but few Caribbean islands have a species of wren, with only the southern house wren in the Lesser Antilles, the Cozumel wren of Cozumel Island, and the highly restricted Zapata wren in a single swamp region in Cuba.

The various species occur in a wide range of habitats, ranging from dry, sparsely wooded country to rainforests. Most species are mainly found at low levels, but members of the genus Campylorhynchus are frequently found higher, and the two members of Odontorchilus are restricted to the forest canopy. A few species, notably the Eurasian wren and the house wren, are often associated with humans. Most species are resident, remaining in Central and South America all year round, but the few species found in temperate regions of the Northern Hemisphere are partially migratory, spending the winter further south.

== Behavior and ecology ==
Song of the Carolina wren

Wrens vary from highly secretive species such as those found in the genus Microcerculus to the highly conspicuous genus Campylorhynchus, the members of which frequently sing from exposed perches. The family as a whole exhibits a great deal of variation in their behavior. Temperate species generally occur in pairs, but some tropical species may occur in parties of up to 20 birds.

Wrens build dome-shaped nests, and may be either monogamous or polygamous, depending on species.

Though little is known about the feeding habits of many of the Neotropical species, wrens are considered primarily insectivorous, eating insects, spiders, and other small arthropods. Many species also take vegetable matter such as seeds and berries, and some (primarily the larger species) take small frogs and lizards. The Eurasian wren has been recorded wading into shallow water to catch small fish and tadpoles; Sumichrast's wren and the Zapata wren take snails; and the giant wren and marsh wren have been recorded attacking and eating bird eggs (in the latter species, even eggs of conspecifics). A local Spanish name for the giant wren and bicolored wren is chupahuevo ('egg-sucker'), but whether the latter actually eats eggs is unclear. The plain wren and northern house wren sometimes destroy bird eggs, and the rufous-and-white wren has been recorded killing nestlings, but this is apparently to eliminate potential food competitors rather than to feed on the eggs or nestlings. Several species of Neotropical wrens sometimes participate in mixed-species flocks or follow army ants, and the Eurasian wren may follow badgers to catch prey items disturbed by them.

== Taxonomy and systematics ==
- Certhioidea
  - Tichodromidae: wallcreeper – 1 species
  - - Sittidae: nuthatches – 29 species
    - - - Salpornithidae: spotted creepers – 2 species
        - Certhiidae: treecreepers – 9 species
      - - Polioptilidae: gnatcatchers – 20 species
        - Troglodytidae: wrens – 96 species

Relationships among families in the superfamily Certhioidea.

Revised following Martínez Gómez et al. (2005) and Mann et al. (2006), the taxonomy of some groups is highly complex, and future species-level splits are likely. Additionally, undescribed taxa are known to exist. The black-capped donacobius is an enigmatic species traditionally placed with the wrens more for lack of a more apparent alternative than as a result of thorough study. It was recently determined to be most likely closer to certain warblers, possibly the newly established Megaluridae, and might constitute a monotypic family.

The genus level cladogram of the Troglodytidae shown below is based on a molecular phylogenetic study by Tyler Imfeld and collaborators that was published in 2024. The number of species in each genus is based on the AviList v2026

- Troglodytidae
  - - Salpinctes – rock wren
    - - Microcerculus – 4 species
      - - Catherpes – canyon wren
        - Hylorchilus – 2 species
  - - - - Campylorhynchus – 15 species
        - - Thryothorus – Carolina wren
          - Thryomanes – Bewick's wren
      - - - Nannus – 3 species
          - Cistothorus – 6 species
        - - Ferminia – Zapata wren
          - Troglodytes – 16 species
    - - Odontorchilus – 2 species
      - - Uropsila – white-bellied wren
        - - Pheugopedius – 13 species
          - - Cinnycerthia – 4 species
            - - Cantorchilus – 12 species
              - - Henicorhina – 5 species
                - - Cyphorhinus – 4 species
                  - Thryophilus – 5 species

Family Troglodytidae

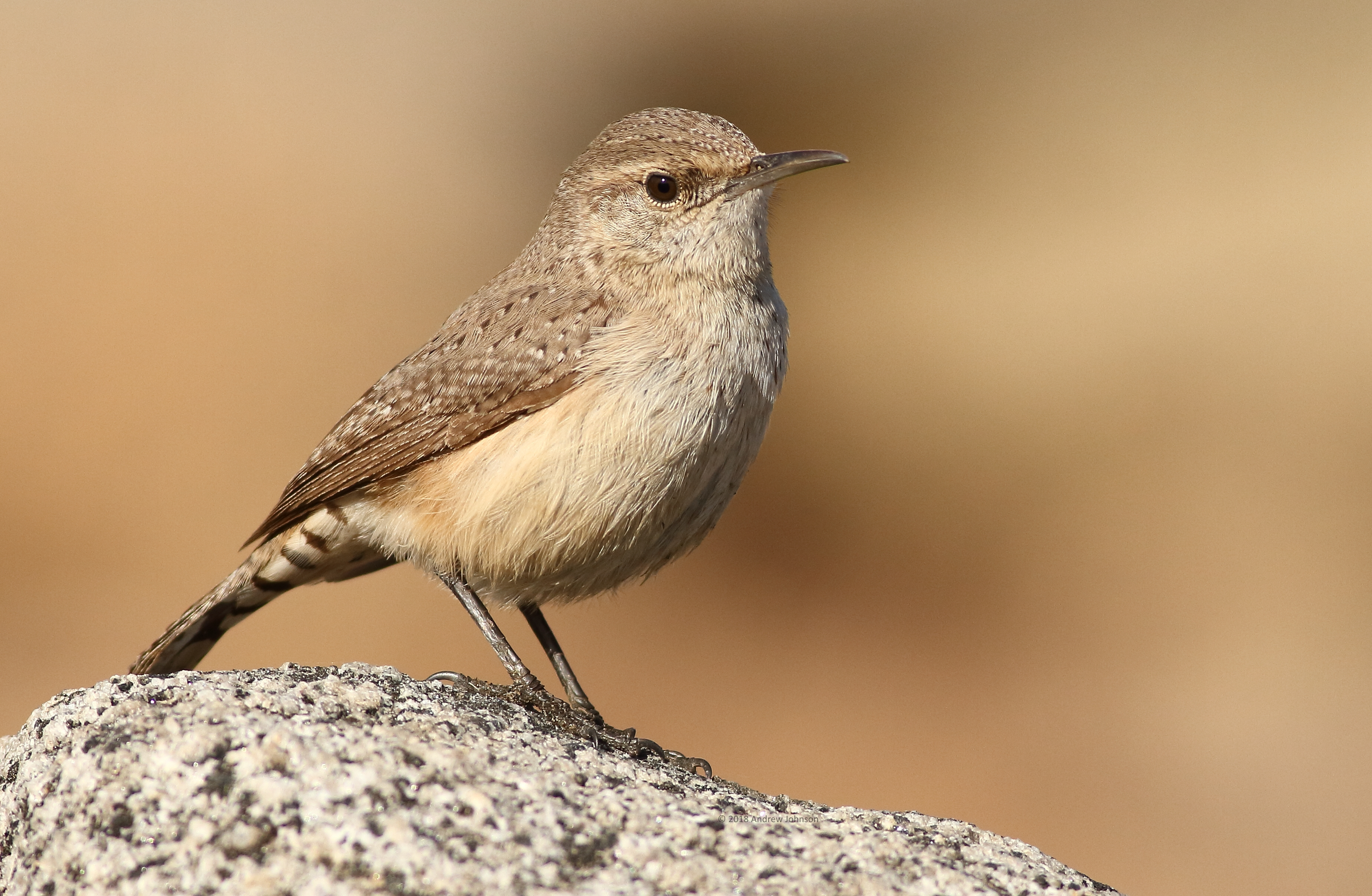
Rock wren (Salpinctes obsoletus)

- Genus Salpinctes
  - Rock wren (Salpinctes obsoletus)

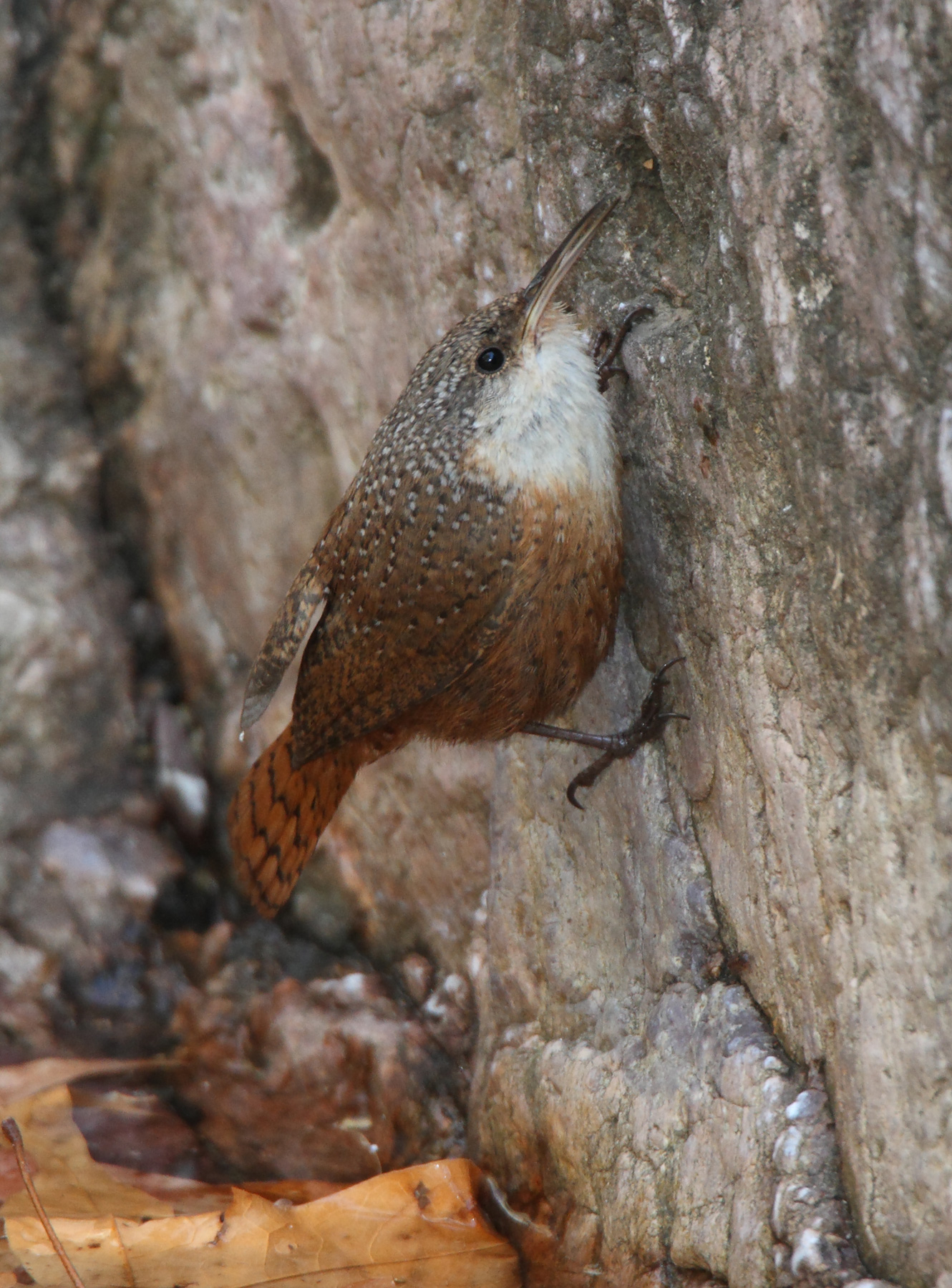
Canyon wren (Catherpes mexicanus)

- Genus Catherpes
  - Canyon wren (Catherpes mexicanus)
- Genus Hylorchilus
  - Sumichrast's wren (Hylorchilus sumichrasti)
  - Nava's wren (Hylorchilus navai)
- Genus Microcerculus
  - Flutist wren (Microcerculus ustulatus)
  - Wing-banded wren (Microcerculus bambla)
  - Northern nightingale-wren (Microcerculus philomela)
  - Southern nightingale-wren (Microcerculus marginatus)
- Genus Thryothorus
  - Carolina wren (Thryothorus ludovicianus)
    - White-browed wren (Thryothorus (ludovicianus) albinucha)

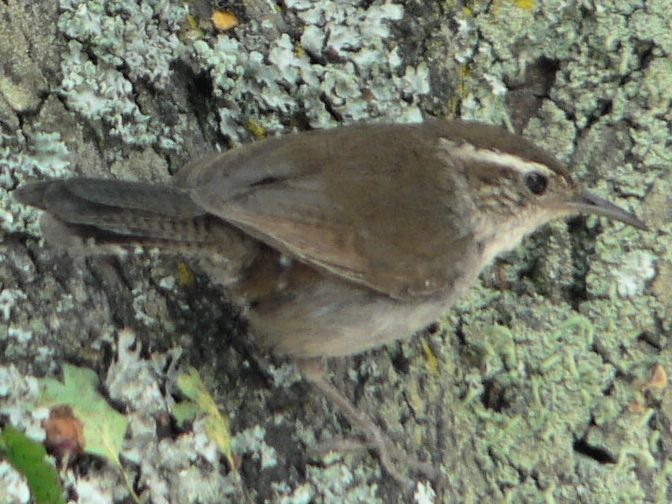
Bewick's wren (Thryomanes bewickii)

- Genus Thryomanes
  - Bewick's wren (Thryomanes bewickii)

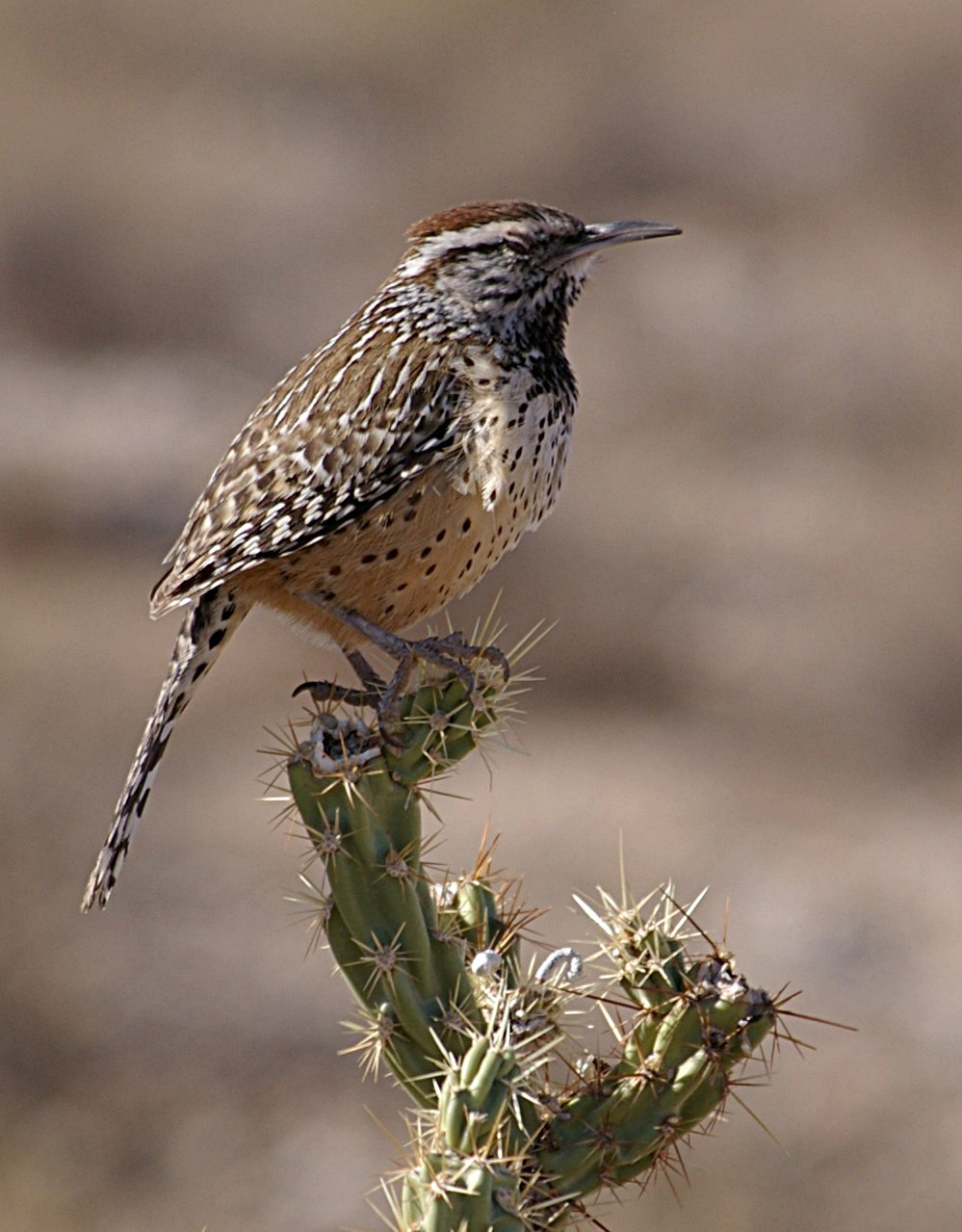
Cactus wren (Campylorhynchus brunneicapillus)

- Genus Campylorhynchus
  - Cactus wren (Campylorhynchus brunneicapillus)
  - Thrush-like wren (Campylorhynchus turdinus)
  - Stripe-backed wren (Campylorhynchus nuchalis)
  - Grey-barred wren (Campylorhynchus megalopterus)
  - Band-backed wren (Campylorhynchus zonatus)
  - Fasciated wren (Campylorhynchus fasciatus)
  - White-headed wren (Campylorhynchus albobrunneus)
  - Yucatan wren (Campylorhynchus yucatanicus)
  - Boucard's wren (Campylorhynchus jocosus)
  - Giant wren (Campylorhynchus chiapensis)
  - Bicolored wren (Campylorhynchus griseus)
  - Spotted wren (Campylorhynchus gularis)
  - Rufous-backed wren (Campylorhynchus capistratus)
  - Veracruz wren (Campylorhynchus rufinucha)
  - Russet-naped wren (Campylorhynchus humilis)

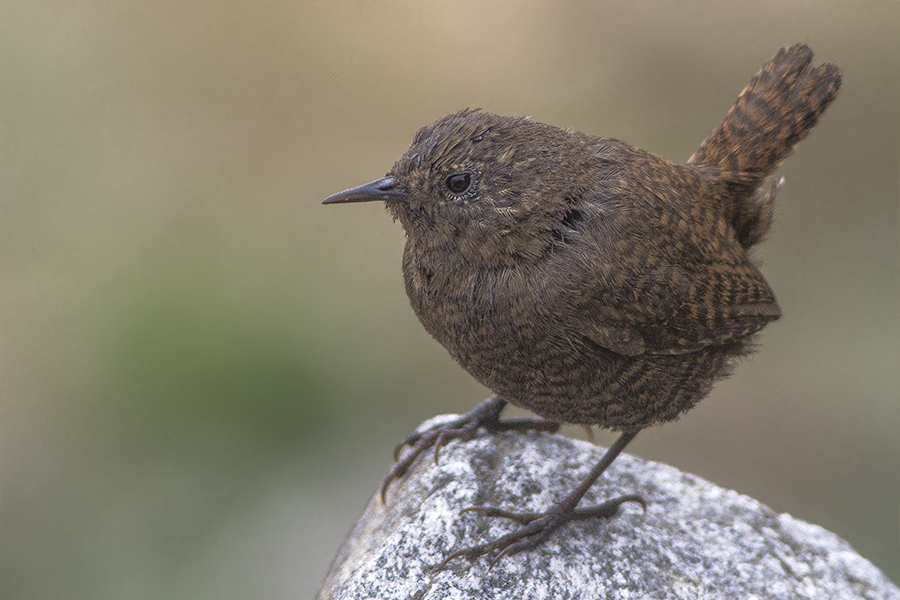
Eurasian wren (Nannus troglodytes)

- Genus Nannus
  - Winter wren (Nannus hiemalis)
  - Pacific wren (Nannus pacificus)
  - Eurasian wren (Nannus troglodytes)
- Genus Cistothorus
  - Eastern marsh wren (Cistothorus palustris)
  - Western marsh wren (Cistothorus paludicola)
  - Sedge wren (Cistothorus stellaris)
  - Mérida wren (Cistothorus meridae)
  - Apolinar's wren (Cistothorus apolinari)
  - Grass wren (Cistothorus platensis)
- Genus Ferminia
  - Zapata wren (Ferminia cerverai)

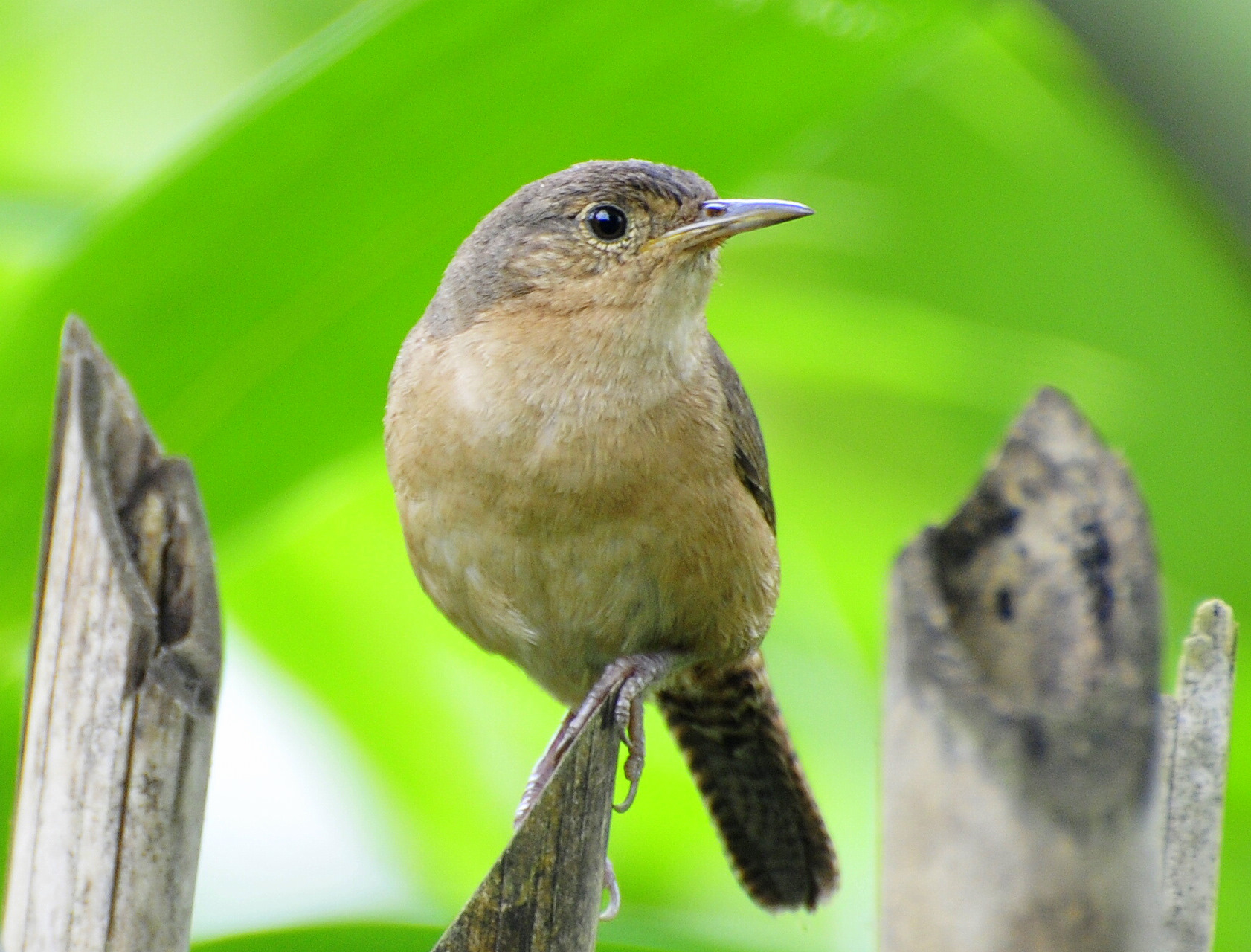
Southern house wren (Troglodytes musculus)

- Genus Troglodytes (16 species)
  - Timberline wren (Troglodytes browni)
  - Rufous-browed wren (Troglodytes rufociliatus)
  - Tepui wren (Troglodytes rufulus)
  - Santa Marta wren (Troglodytes monticola)
  - Mountain wren (Troglodytes solstitialis)
  - Ochraceous wren (Troglodytes ochraceus)
  - Cobb's wren (Troglodytes cobbi)
  - Socorro wren (Troglodytes sissonii)
  - Clarión wren (Troglodytes tanneri)
  - Northern house wren (Troglodytes aedon)
  - St. Lucia wren (Troglodytes mesoleucus)
  - St. Vincent wren (Troglodytes musicus)
  - Grenada wren (Troglodytes grenadensis)
  - Kalinago wren (Troglodytes martinicensis)
  - Cozumel wren (Troglodytes beani)
  - Southern house wren (Troglodytes musculus)

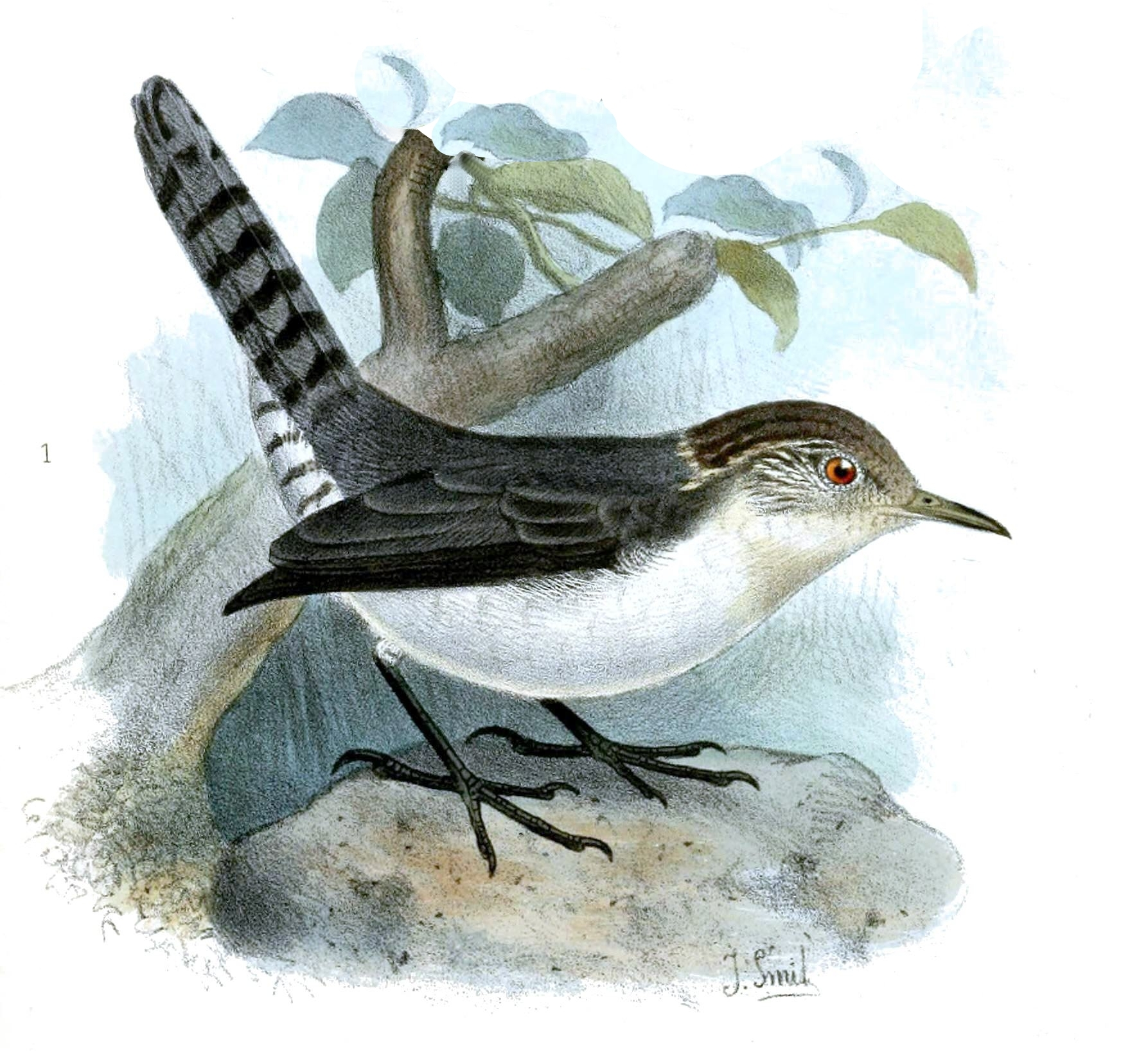
Grey-mantled wren (Odontorchilus branickii)

- Genus Odontorchilus
  - Tooth-billed wren (Odontorchilus cinereus)
  - Grey-mantled wren (Odontorchilus branickii)
- Genus Uropsila
  - White-bellied wren (Uropsila leucogastra)

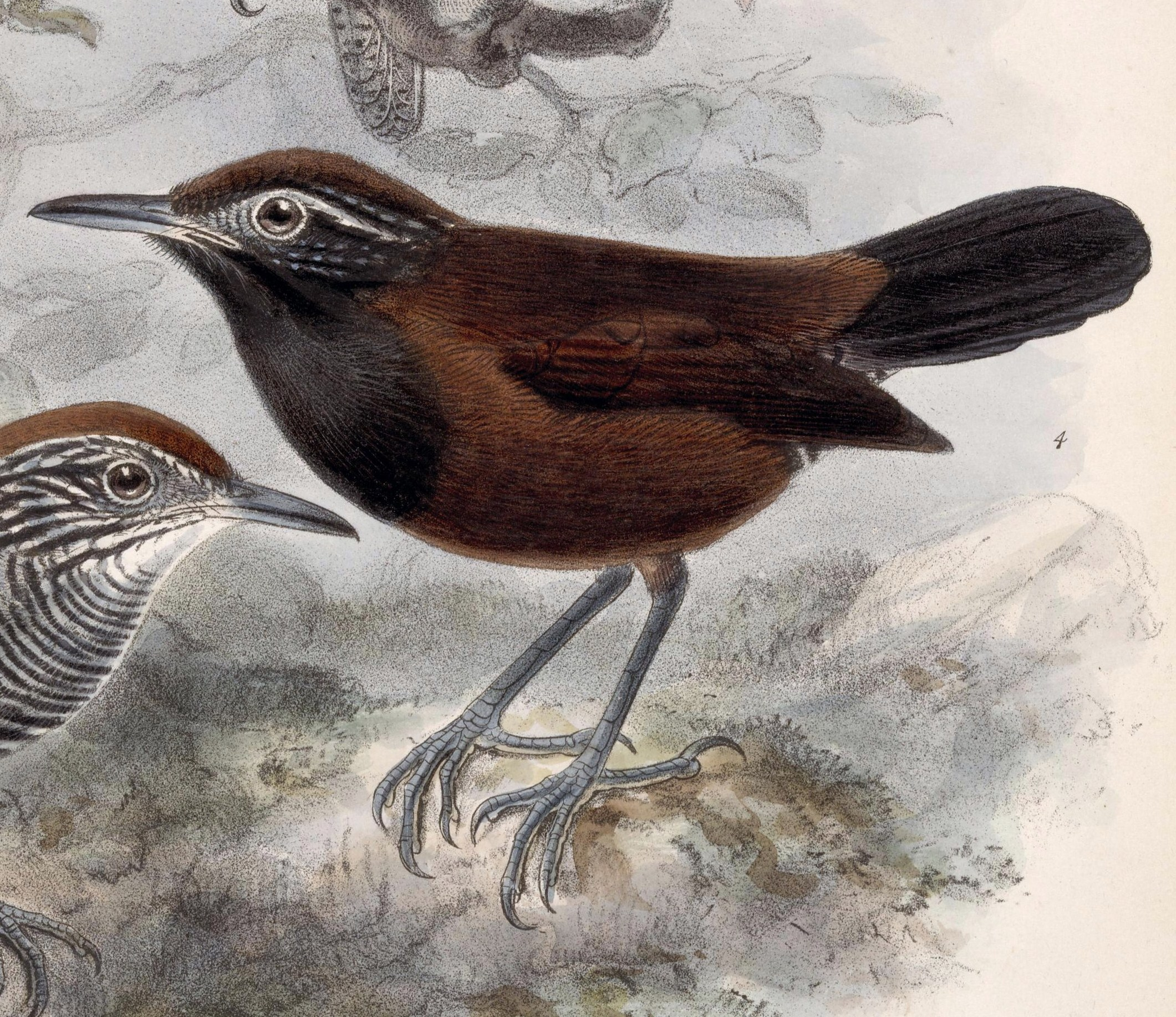
Black-throated wren (Pheugopedius atrogularis)

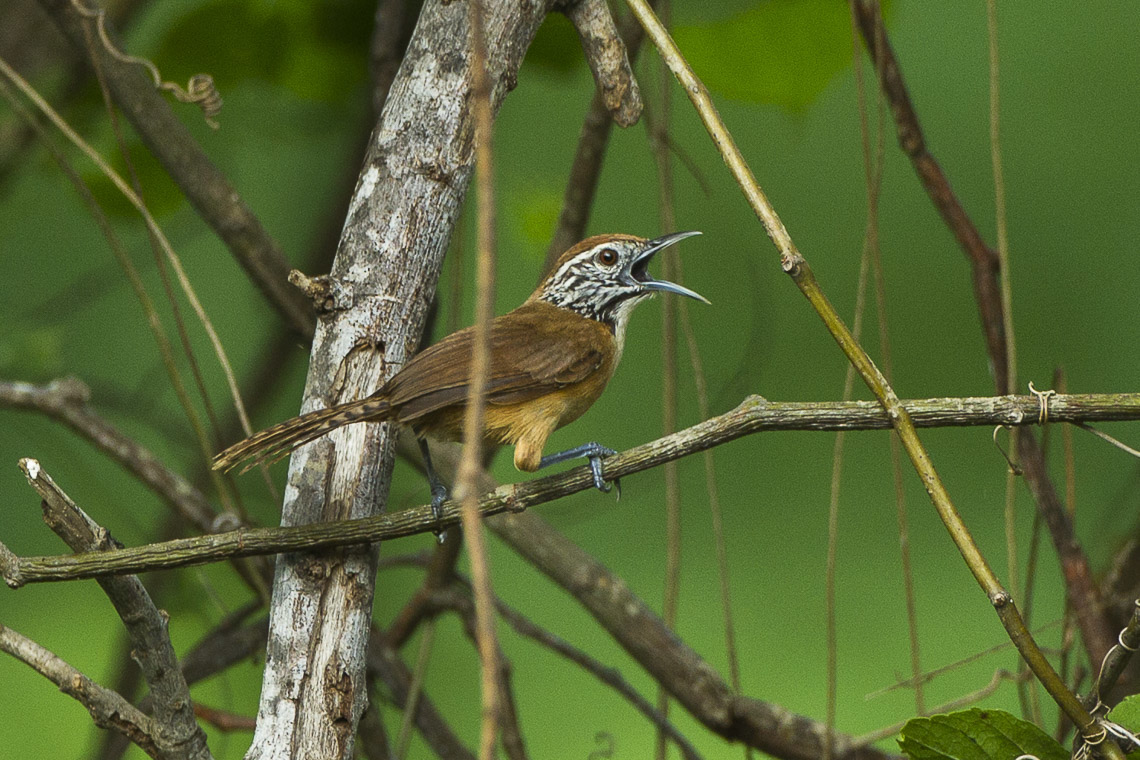
Happy wren (Pheugopedius felix)

- Genus Pheugopedius (formerly included in Thryothorus)
  - Sooty-headed wren (Pheugopedius spadix)
  - Black-throated wren (Pheugopedius atrogularis)
  - Speckle-breasted wren (Pheugopedius sclateri)
  - Happy wren (Pheugopedius felix)
  - Spot-breasted wren (Pheugopedius maculipectus)
  - Rufous-breasted wren (Pheugopedius rutilus)
  - Black-bellied wren (Pheugopedius fasciatoventris)
  - Moustached wren (Pheugopedius genibarbis)
  - Coraya wren (Pheugopedius coraya)
  - Whiskered wren (Pheugopedius mystacalis)
  - Inca wren (Pheugopedius eisenmanni)
  - Grey-browed wren (Pheugopedius schulenbergi)
  - Plain-tailed wren (Pheugopedius euophrys)
- Genus Cinnycerthia
  - Fulvous wren (Cinnycerthia fulva)
  - Rufous wren (Cinnycerthia unirufa)
  - Peruvian wren (Cinnycerthia peruana)
  - Sepia-brown wren (Cinnycerthia olivascens)

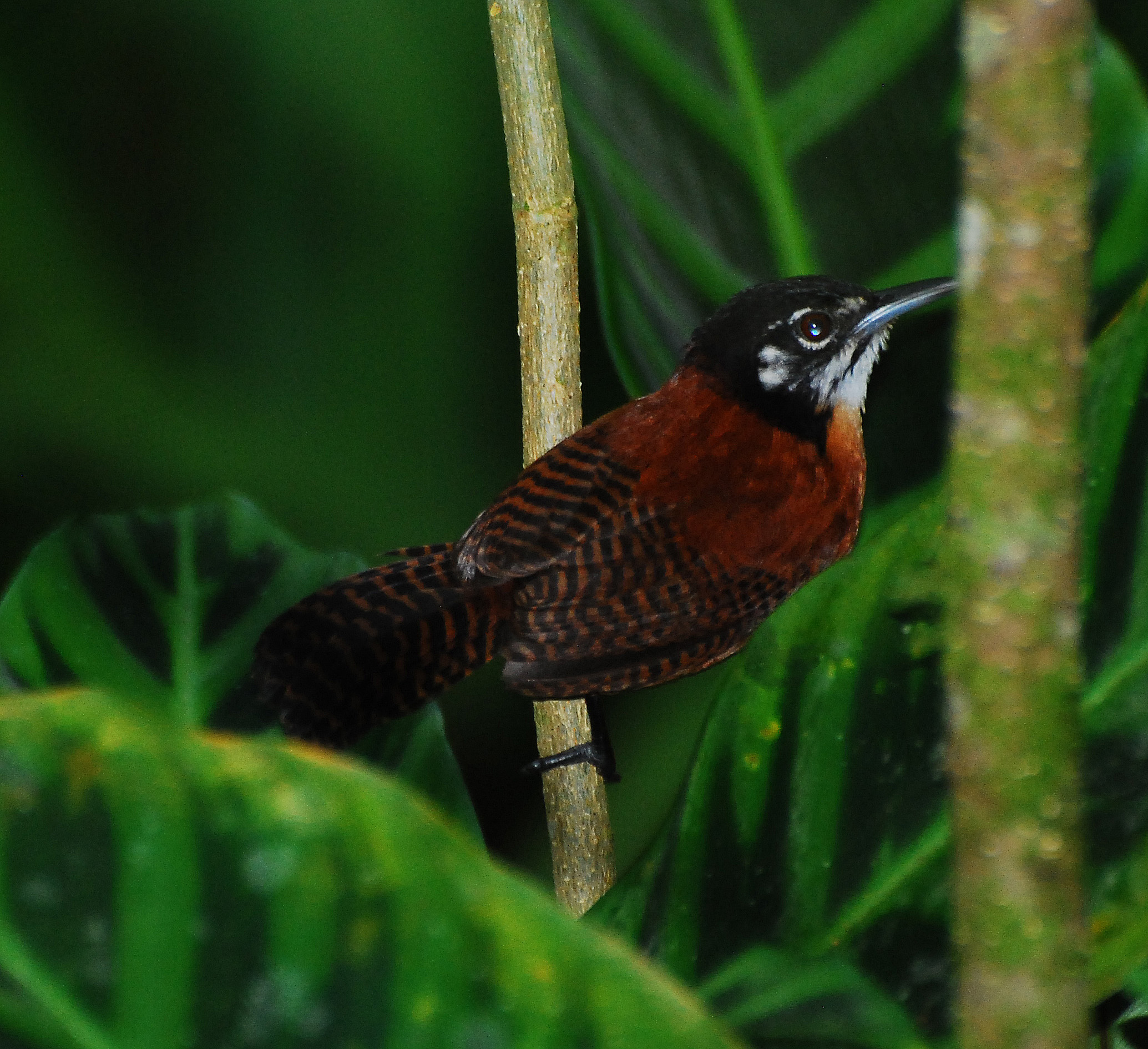
Bay wren (Cantorchilus nigricapillus)

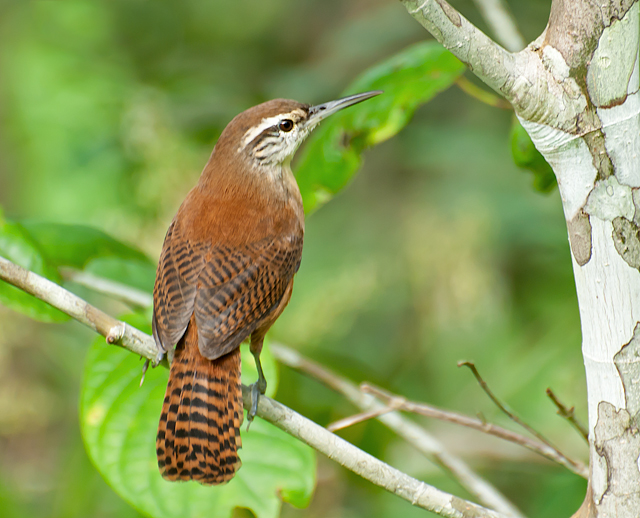
Long-billed wren (Cantorchilus longirostris)

- Genus Cantorchilus (formerly included in Thryothorus)
  - Stripe-breasted wren (Cantorchilus thoracicus)
  - Stripe-throated wren (Cantorchilus leucopogon)
  - Cabanis's wren (Cantorchilus modestus)
  - Canebrake wren (Cantorchilus zeledoni)
  - Isthmian wren (Cantorchilus elutus)
  - Grey wren (Cantorchilus griseus)
  - Riverside wren (Cantorchilus semibadius)
  - Bay wren (Cantorchilus nigricapillus)
  - Superciliated wren (Cantorchilus superciliaris)
  - Buff-breasted wren (Cantorchilus leucotis) (probably not monophyletic)
  - Fawn-breasted wren (Cantorchilus guarayanus)
  - Long-billed wren (Cantorchilus longirostris)
- Genus Henicorhina (wood wrens)
  - Bar-winged wood wren (Henicorhina leucoptera)
  - White-breasted wood wren (Henicorhina leucosticta)
  - Grey-breasted wood wren (Henicorhina leucophrys)
  - Hermit wood wren (Henicorhina anachoreta) – split from H. leucophrys
  - Munchique wood wren (Henicorhina negreti)
- Genus Cyphorhinus
  - Song wren (Cyphorhinus phaeocephalus)
  - Musician wren (Cyphorhinus arada)
  - Southern chestnut-breasted wren (Cyphorhinus thoracicus)
  - Northern chestnut-breasted wren (Cyphorhinus dichrous)
- Genus Thryophilus (formerly included in Thryothorus)
  - Sinaloa wren (Thryophilus sinaloa)
  - Banded wren (Thryophilus pleurostictus)
  - Rufous-and-white wren (Thryophilus rufalbus)
  - Antioquia wren (Thryophilus sernai)
  - Niceforo's wren (Thryophilus nicefori)

== Relationship with humans ==
The wren features prominently in culture. The Eurasian wren has been long considered "the king of birds" in Europe. Killing one or harassing its nest is associated with bad luck, such as broken bones, lightning strikes on homes, or injury to cattle. Wren Day, celebrated in parts of Ireland on Saint Stephen's Day (26 December), features a fake wren being paraded around town on a decorative pole; up to the 20th century, real birds were hunted for this purpose. A possible origin for the tradition is revenge for the betrayal of Saint Stephen by a noisy wren when he was trying to hide from enemies in a bush.

The Carolina wren (Thryothorus ludovicianus) has been the state bird of South Carolina since 1948, and features on the back of its state quarter. The British farthing featured a wren on the reverse side from 1937 until its demonetisation in 1960. The Cactus wren (Campylorhynchus brunneicapillus) was designated the state bird of Arizona in 1931.

The Women's Royal Naval Service (WRNS) were nicknamed Wrens based on the acronym WRNS. After the Women's Royal Navy Service was integrated into the Royal Navy in 1993, the title of Wren was dropped from official usage, however unofficially female sailors are still referred to as Wrens.

The South Carolina state quarter (left) and British farthing (right) both feature wrens

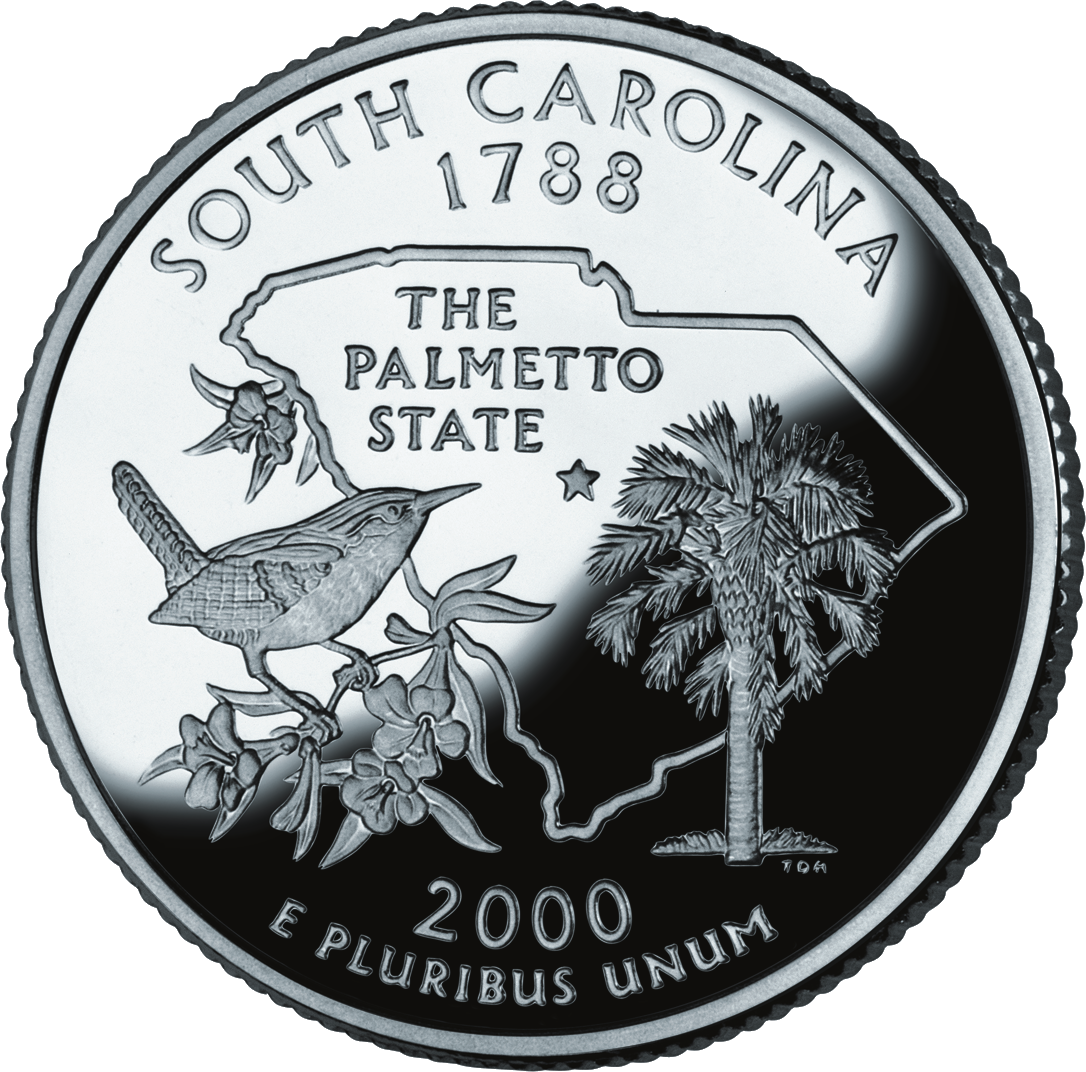

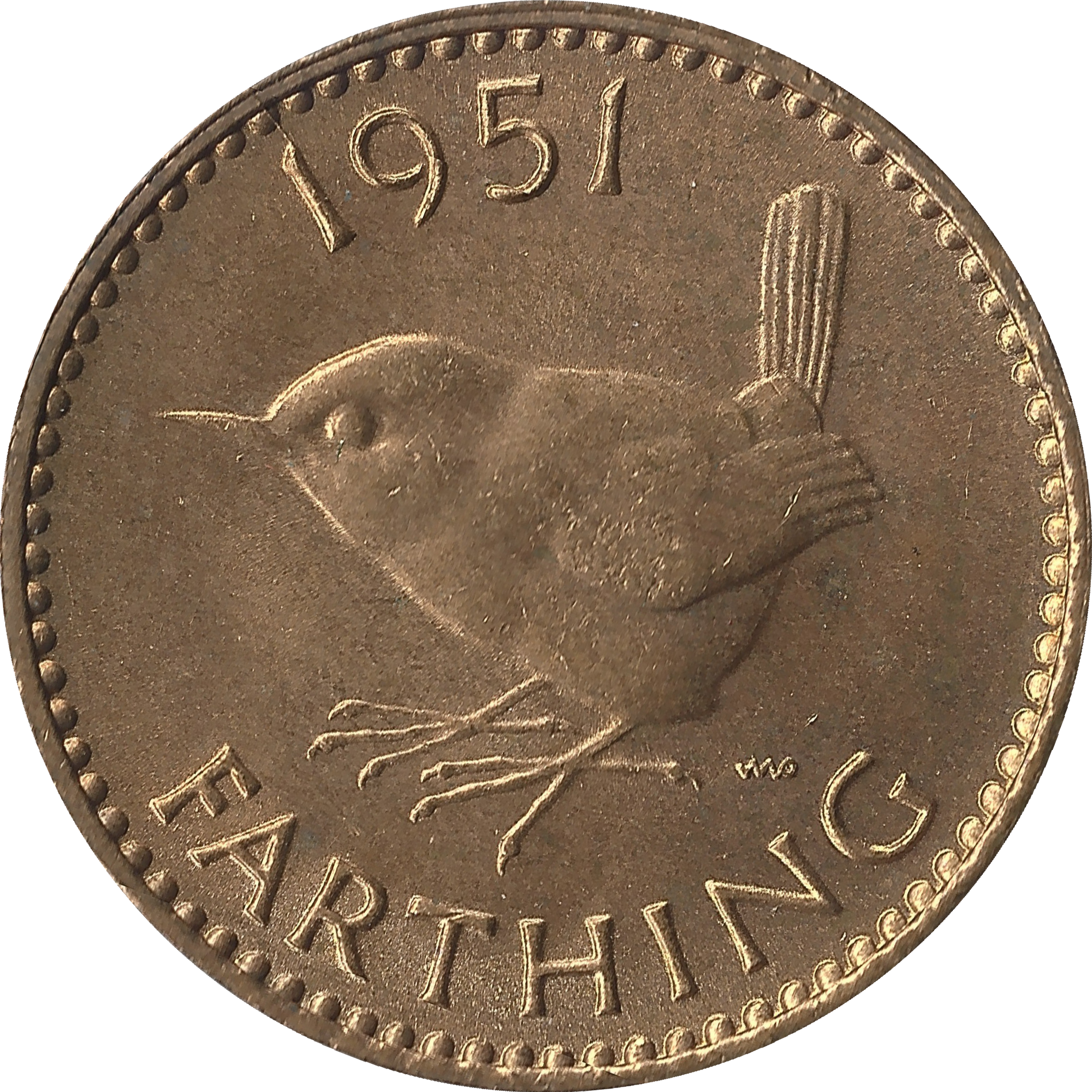
