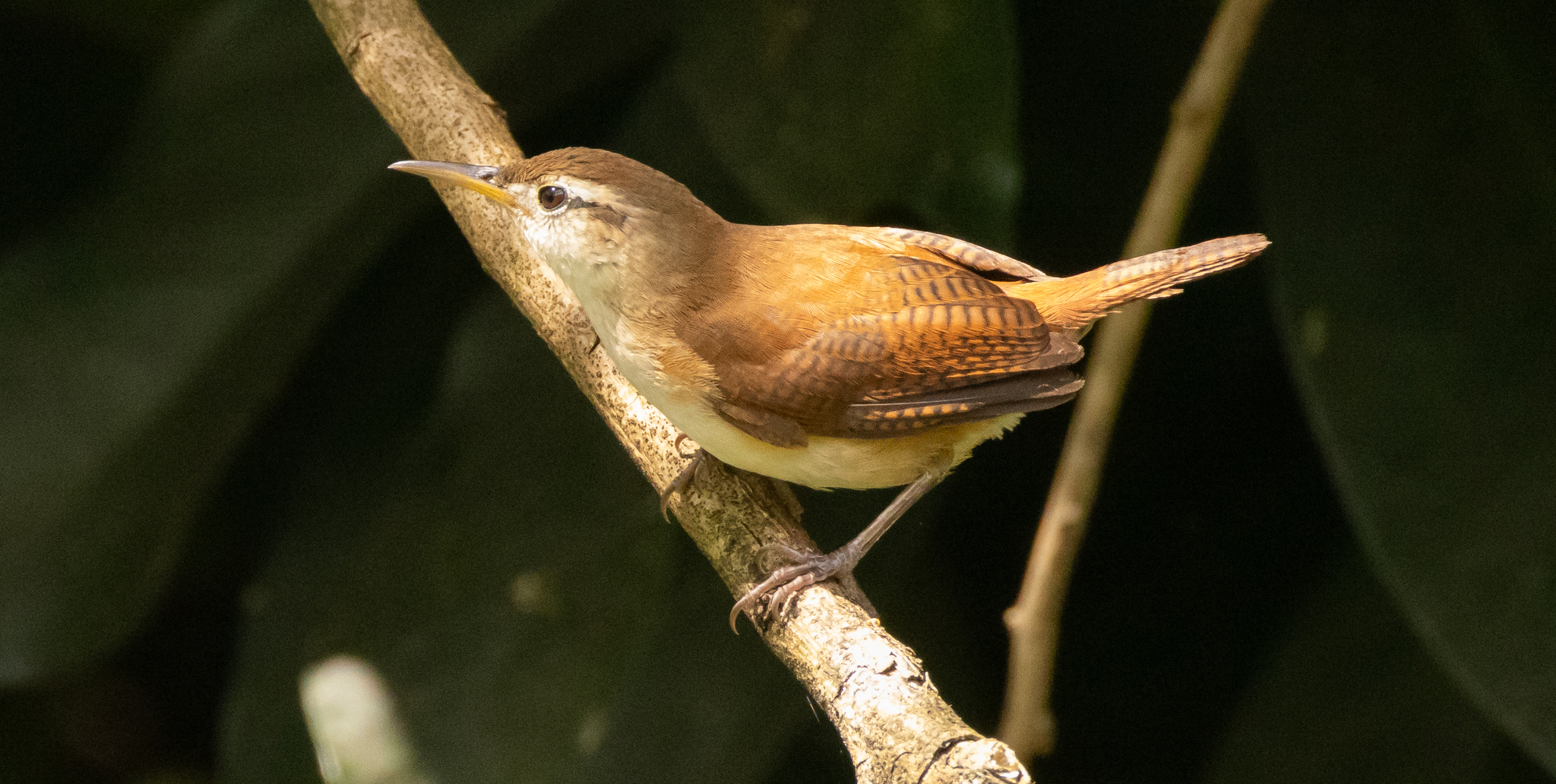

Scientific classification
- Kingdom: Animalia
- Phylum: Chordata
- Class: Aves
- Order: Passeriformes
- Family: Troglodytidae
- Genus: Troglodytes
- Species: T. musicus

Binomial name
- Troglodytes musicus (Lawrence, 1878)

Synonyms
- Thryothorus musicus Lawrence, 1878; Troglodytes martinicensis musicus (Lawrence, 1878); Troglodytes musculus musicus (Lawrence, 1878); Troglodytes aedon musicus (Lawrence, 1878)

= St. Vincent wren =

Species of bird

The St. Vincent wren (Troglodytes musicus) is a very small passerine bird in the wren family Troglodytidae that is found on the Caribbean island of Saint Vincent. The name troglodytes means "hole dweller", and is a reference to the bird's tendency to disappear into crevices when hunting insects or to seek shelter. It was formerly considered to be conspecific with the house wren, now renamed the northern house wren (Troglodytes aedon).

== Taxonomy ==
The St. Vincent wren was formally described in 1878 by the American ornithologist George Newbold Lawrence based on specimens collected by the naturalist Frederick A. Ober on the island of Saint Vincent. Lawrence coined the binomial name Thryothorus musicus, where the specific epithet is Latin meaning "musical". The St. Vincent wren was formerly considered to be a subspecies of the house wren, now renamed the northern house wren (Troglodytes aedon). It is now recognised as a separate species based on differences in vocalizations, plumage, ecology and genetics. The species is monotypic: no subspecies are recognised.

== Etymology ==
The Saint Vincent wren is classified in the genus Troglodytes; this name means "cave dweller" in Greek. The specific name, musicus, is Latin and means "musical".

== Description ==
The Saint Vincent wren has reddish-brown upperparts contrasting with whitish underparts. The wings and tail are barred with dark and tail, a pale supercilium and face with reddish-brown with darker speckling on the breast, sides and undertail. It has a buzzing call and its song is reported to be musical.

== Distribution and habitat ==
The Saint Vincent wren is endemic to the island of Saint Vincent in Saint Vincent and the Grenadines, where it is found from montane evergreen forests and brushy woodlands to farmland and built up areas.
