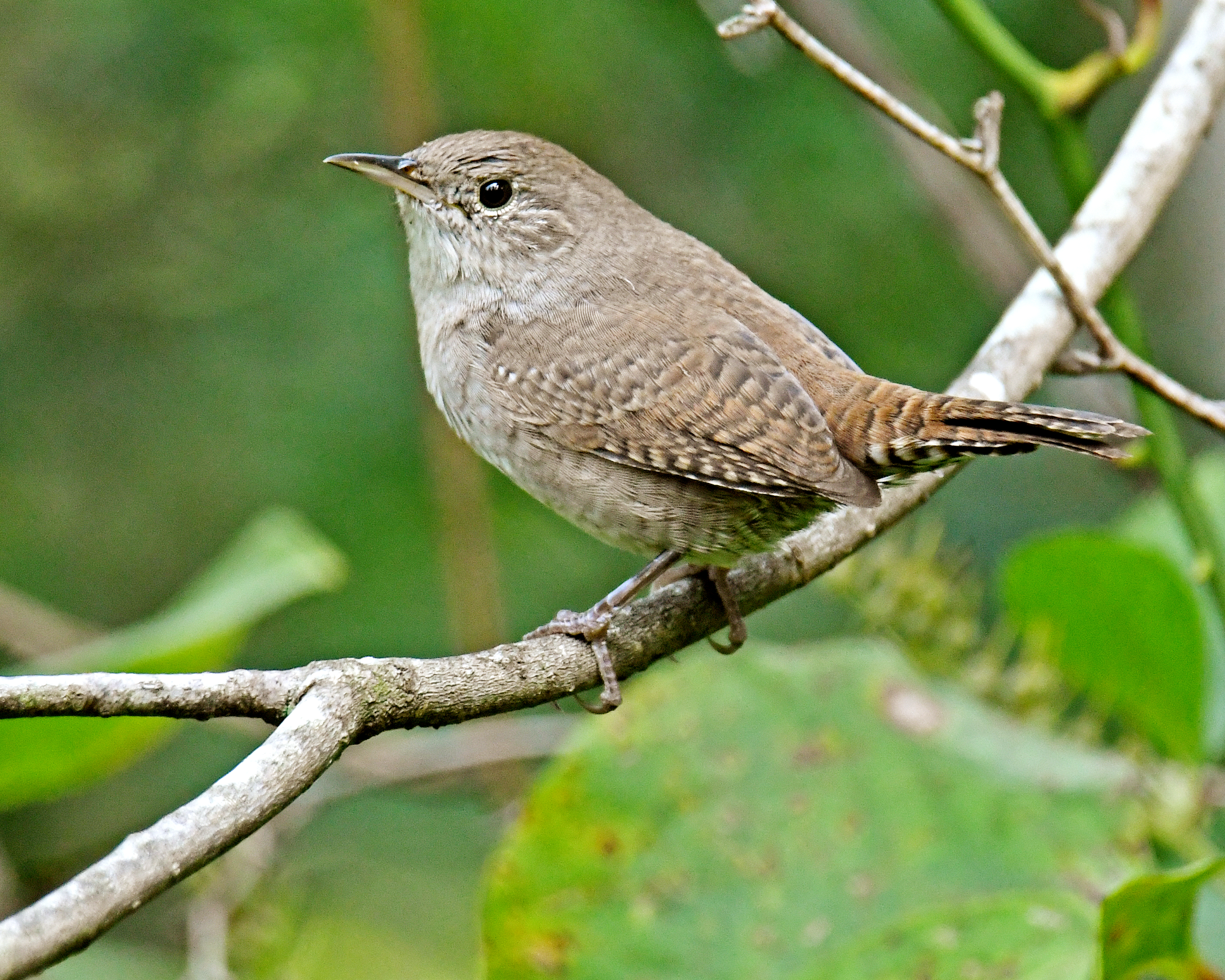
- Northern house wren (Troglodytes aedon) in the Patuxent Research Refuge, Maryland, USA

Scientific classification
- Kingdom: Animalia
- Phylum: Chordata
- Class: Aves
- Order: Passeriformes
- Family: Troglodytidae
- Genus: Troglodytes; Vieillot, 1809

Type species
- Troglodytes aedon Vieillot, 1809

Species
- See text

Synonyms
- Anorthura; Thryorchilus

= Troglodytes (bird) =

Genus of birds

Troglodytes (Note: Etymology: Ancient Greek τρωγλοδύτες "cave-dwellers" (compare troglodyte), from trogle (τρώγλη) "hole" + dyein (δυειν) "to enter", in reference to the tendency of these wrens to enter small crevices as they search for food.) is a genus of small passerine birds in the wren family. These wrens are around 9–14 centimetres (3.5–5.5 in) long. They are brownish above and somewhat paler below, with strong legs. Their short rounded wings and frequently cocked tail have a dark barred pattern. The flight is direct and buzzing.

Troglodytes wrens are generally found in somewhat cooler habitats than most of their relatives. Most of the species are found in the mountains from Mexico to northern South America. Several species are found in temperate latitudes. The former house wren occurs widely in both tropical and temperate lowlands, but is now split into several species, one each in North and South America, and the others island endemics. The Cobb's wren of the Falkland Islands is a species which tolerates harsh conditions well.

Like other wrens, they are elusive as they hunt for small insects and spiders, but they readily reveal their positions through their loud songs.

They are territorial birds.

== Systematics and species ==
The genus Troglodytes was described by the French ornithologist Louis Pierre Vieillot in 1809. The type species was subsequently designated as Troglodytes aedon, the northern house wren.

The Eurasian wren, Pacific wren, and winter wren were formerly included in this genus. A 1999 study found that the then broadly defined Troglodytes troglodytes, which included all three species, was distantly related to other members of Troglodytes and recommended its placement in Nannus. After a 2024 study confirmed that the three species formed a clade sister to Cistothorus rather than core Troglodytes, in 2026, the American Ornithological Society and AviList adopted Nannus for these species.

A 2024 study also found that the timberline wren (the sole species of the genus Thryorchilus) is closely related to Troglodytes. Although the species-level phylogeny recovered Thryorchilus as the sister group to Troglodytes, analyses incorporating additional intraspecific lineages placed Thryorchilus within Troglodytes, rendering the latter paraphyletic. In 2026, both the American Ornithological Society and AviList merged Thryorchilus into Troglodytes.

Within the remaining core of the genus, there appear to be two clades, one comprising the house wren group and another containing Central and South American species.

A number of the Troglodytes species, such as the Clarion wren, were formerly considered subspecies of the house wren, and the Central and South American forms of the house wren have also now been further split as the southern house wren T. musculus, as have the Caribbean island endemic wrens Cozumel wren T. beani, Kalinago wren T. martinicensis, St. Lucia wren T. mesoleucus, St. Vincent wren T. musicus, and Grenada wren T. grenadensis. The Socorro wren, in older texts placed in Thryomanes (Bewick's wren), proved to be a close relative of the house wren complex, as indicated by "manners, song, plumage, etc.", and by biogeography and mtDNA NADH dehydrogenase subunit 2 sequence analysis.

=== Species ===
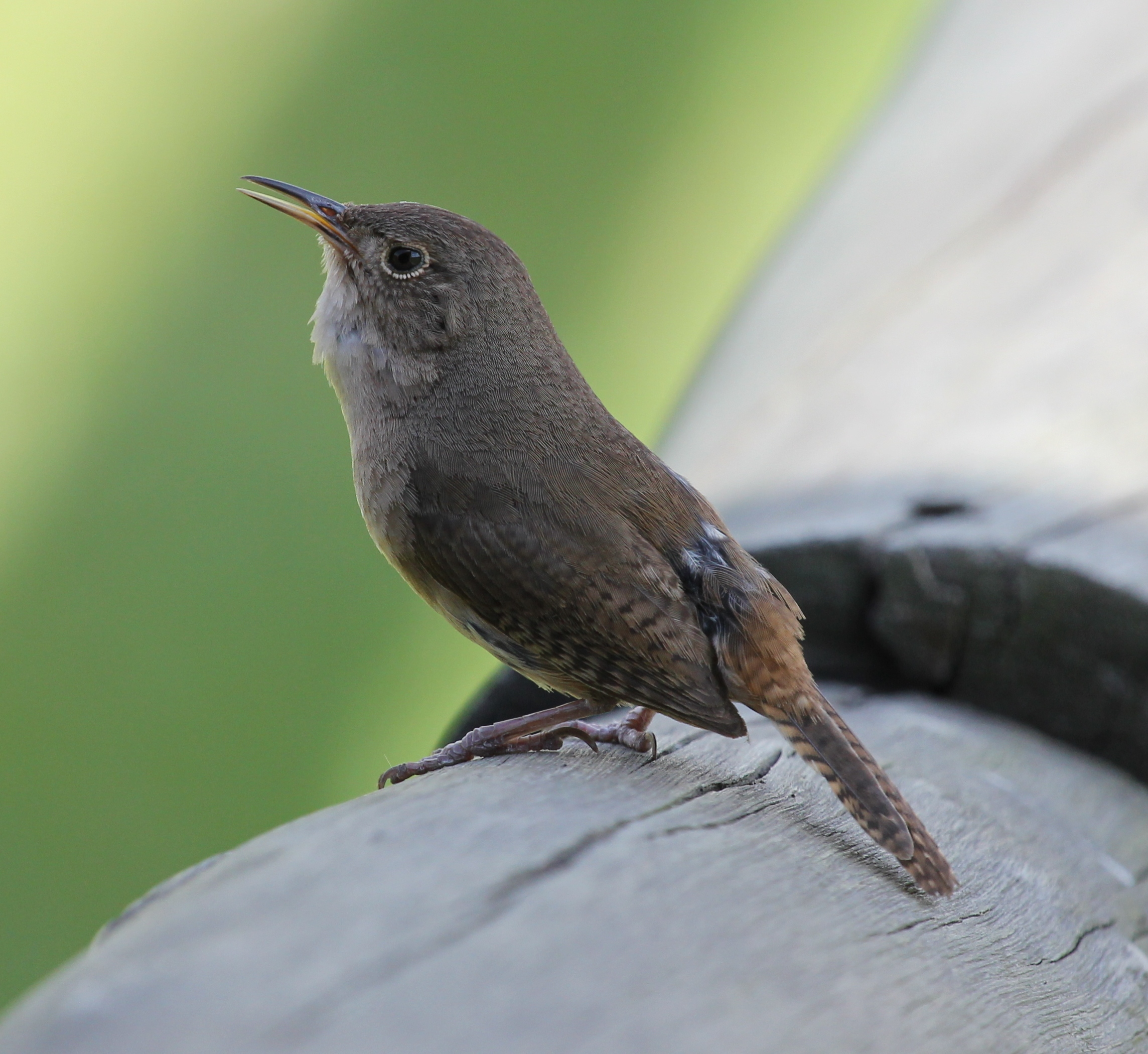
Southern house wren (Troglodytes musculus)

The genus contains 16 species:

- Timberline wren, Troglodytes browni
- Rufous-browed wren, Troglodytes rufociliatus
- Tepui wren, Troglodytes rufulus
- Santa Marta wren, Troglodytes monticola
- Mountain wren, Troglodytes solstitialis
- Ochraceous wren, Troglodytes ochraceus
- Cobb's wren, Troglodytes cobbi – split from T. aedon
- Socorro wren, Troglodytes sissonii
- Clarion wren, Troglodytes tanneri
- Northern house wren, Troglodytes aedon – formerly house wren before split of complex
- St. Lucia wren, Troglodytes mesoleucus – split from T. aedon
- St. Vincent wren, Troglodytes musicus – split from T. aedon
- Grenada wren, Troglodytes grenadensis – split from T. aedon
- Kalinago wren, Troglodytes martinicensis – split from T. aedon
- Cozumel wren, Troglodytes beani – split from T. aedon
- Southern house wren, Troglodytes musculus – split from T. aedon
