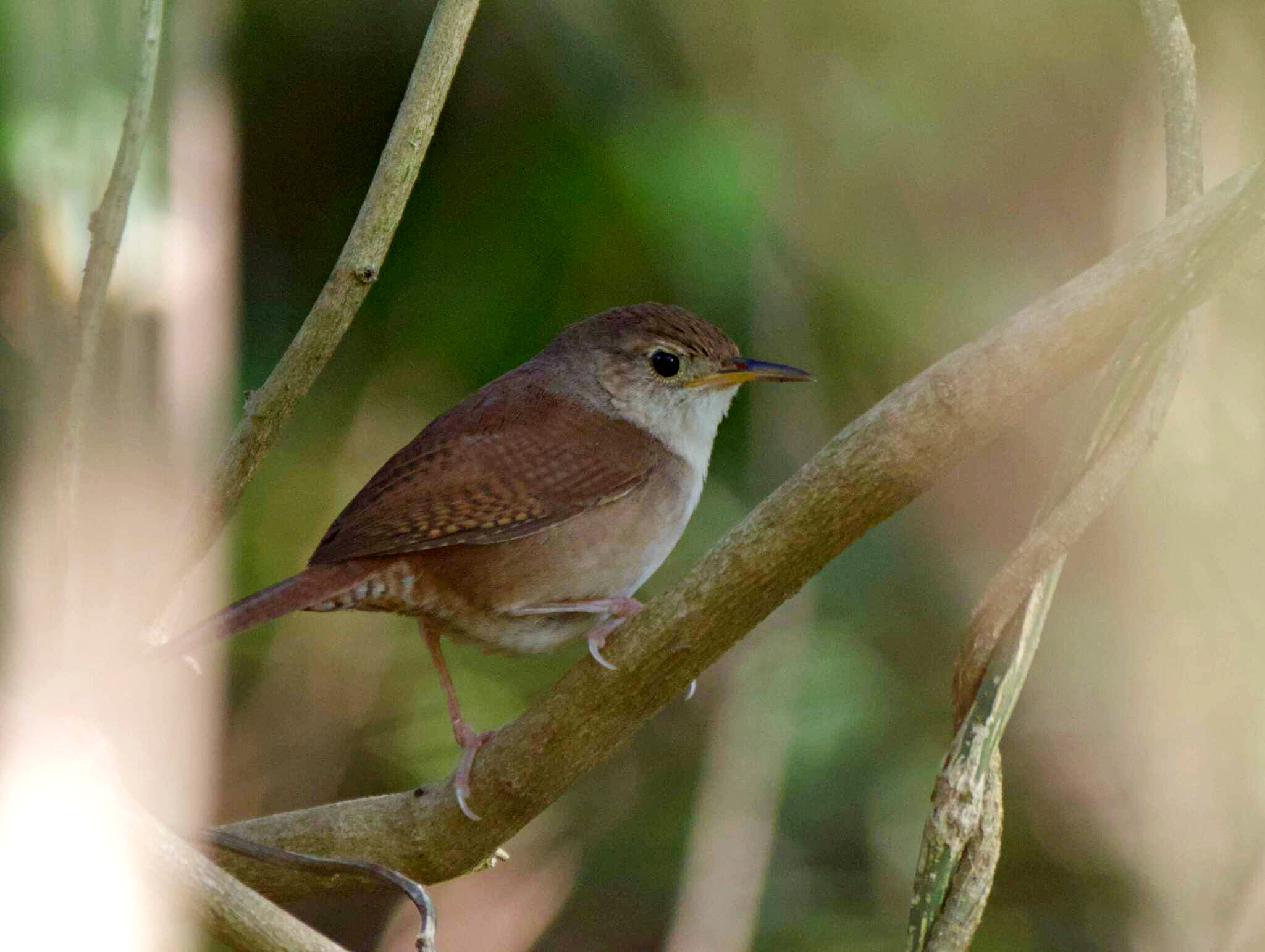

Conservation status
- Least Concern (IUCN 3.1)

Scientific classification
- Kingdom: Animalia
- Phylum: Chordata
- Class: Aves
- Order: Passeriformes
- Family: Troglodytidae
- Genus: Troglodytes
- Species: T. beani

Binomial name
- Troglodytes beani Ridgway, 1885

= Cozumel wren =

Species of bird

The Cozumel wren (Troglodytes beani) is a very small passerine bird in the wren family Troglodytidae that is endemic to the small island of Cozumel off the eastern coast of Mexico. The name troglodytes means "hole dweller", and is a reference to the bird's tendency to disappear into crevices when hunting insects or to seek shelter. It was formerly considered to be conspecific with the northern house wren (Troglodytes aedon).

== Taxonomy ==
The Cozumel wren was formally described in 1885 by the American ornithologist Robert Ridgway based on a specimen collected on the island of Cozumel. He coined the binomial name Troglodytes beani where the specific epithet was chosen to honour Tarleton Hoffman Bean who had helped collect the holotype. The Cozumel wren was formerly considered to be part of the house wren complex that also included the northern house wren, the southern house wren and five other insular forms. The Cozumel wren was split from the complex based on diffences in the plumage, differences in vocalizations and genetic differences. differences in vocalizations, and genetic differences. The species is monotypic: no subspecies are recognised.
