= Santa Marta wren =

Conservation status
- Critically Endangered (IUCN 3.1)

Scientific classification
- Kingdom: Animalia
- Phylum: Chordata
- Class: Aves
- Order: Passeriformes
- Family: Troglodytidae
- Genus: Troglodytes
- Species: T. monticola

Binomial name
- Troglodytes monticola Bangs, 1899

Species of bird

The Santa Marta wren (Troglodytes monticola) is a species of bird in the family Troglodytidae. It is endemic to Colombia.

== Taxonomy and systematics ==
The Santa Marta wren has often been treated a subspecies of mountain wren (Troglodytes solstitialis). The South American Classification Committee of the American Ornithological Society (SACC/AOS) considers those two, ochraceous wren (T. achraceus), rufous-browed wren (T. rufociliatus), and tepui wren (T. rufulus) to be a superspecies.

The Santa Marta wren is monotypic.

== Description ==
The Santa Marta wren is 11.5 cm (4.5 in) long. The adult's crown and upperparts are rufous brown with blackish barring on the lower back. The tail is brown and also has dark barring. It has a buffy supercilium and eyering. Its chin is pale buff that darkens to buffy brown on the throat and chest. Its flanks are buffy white with dark brown bars and the vent area white with blackish bars. The juvenile is similar but has dark tips on the feathers of the back and underparts.

== Distribution and habitat ==
The Santa Marta wren is found only in the Sierra Nevada de Santa Marta of northern Colombia. It inhabits the edges of elfin forest, páramo, and scrub at tree line. In elevation it ranges from 3,200 to 4,800 m (10,500 to 15,700 ft).

== Behavior ==
=== Feeding ===
The Santa Marta wren forages from the ground to middle levels and sometimes joins mixed species foraging flocks. No information on its diet has been published.

=== Breeding ===
No information on the Santa Marta wren's breeding phenology has been published.

=== Vocalization ===
The Santa Marta wren's song has not been formally described. Its call is a repeated "di-di".

== Status ==
The IUCN has assessed the Santa Marta wren as Critically Endangered. Its population is estimated to be fewer than 250 adults. It "is largely contained within Sierra Nevada de Santa Marta National Park; but, despite supposedly protected status of the area, forest destruction, overgrazing and burning continue almost unabated."
