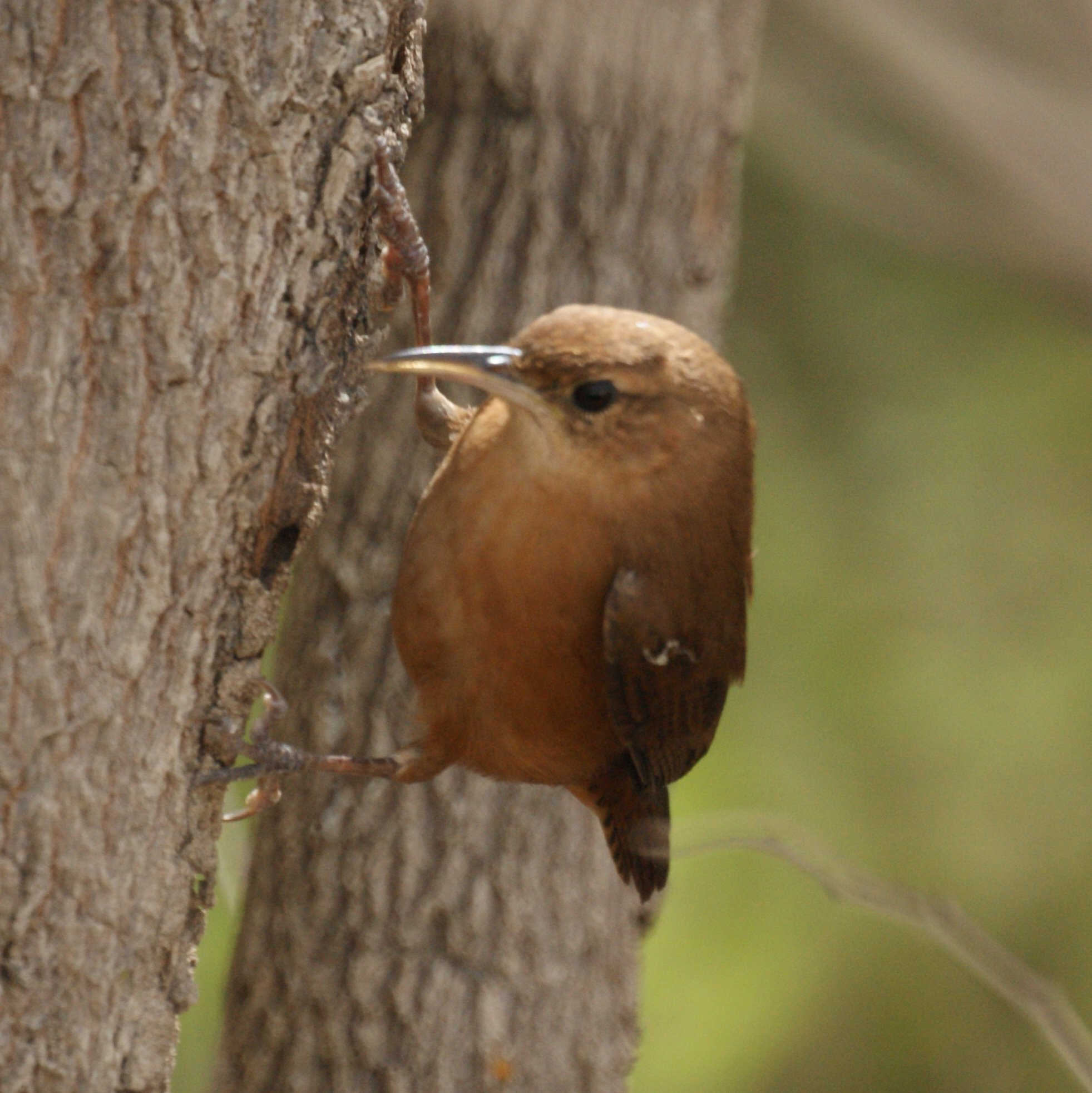

Scientific classification
- Kingdom: Animalia
- Phylum: Chordata
- Class: Aves
- Order: Passeriformes
- Family: Troglodytidae
- Genus: Troglodytes
- Species: T. grenadensis

Binomial name
- Troglodytes grenadensis (Lawrence, 1878)

Synonyms
- Thryothorus grenadensis Lawrence, 1878; Troglodytes martinicensis grenadensis (Lawrence, 1878); Troglodytes musculus grenadensis (Lawrence, 1878); Troglodytes aedon grenadensis (Lawrence, 1878)

= Grenada wren =

Species of bird

The Grenada wren (Troglodytes grenadensis) is a very small passerine bird in the wren family Troglodytidae that is found on the Caribbean island of Grenada. The name troglodytes means "hole dweller", and is a reference to the bird's tendency to disappear into crevices when hunting insects or to seek shelter. It was formerly considered to be conspecific with the house wren, now renamed the northern house wren (Troglodytes aedon).

== Taxonomy ==
The Grenada wren was formally described in 1878 by the American ornithologist George Newbold Lawrence, based on specimens collected by the naturalist Frederick A. Ober on the island of Grenada. Lawrence coined the binomial name Thryothorus grenadensis. The Grenada wren was formerly considered to be a subspecies of the house wren, now renamed the northern house wren (Troglodytes aedon). It is now recognised as a separate species based on differences in morphology and genetics. The species is monotypic: no subspecies are recognised.

== Etymology ==
The Grenada wren is classified in the genus Troglodytes; this name means "cave dweller" in Greek. The specific name, grenadensis, means "of Grenada".

== Description ==
The Grenada wren is a small, reddish brown songbird. The wings and tail are marked with dark bars, and there is no supercilium. The song is loud and consists of trilling and chattering, with harsher, scolding calls.

== Distribution and habitat ==
The Grenada wren is endemic to the main island of Grenada and appears to be uncommon on the offshore islands. It prefers to be near human habitation, and will nest in cavities in buildings. In unbroken native forest, this species is found at lower densities than in areas of habitation.
