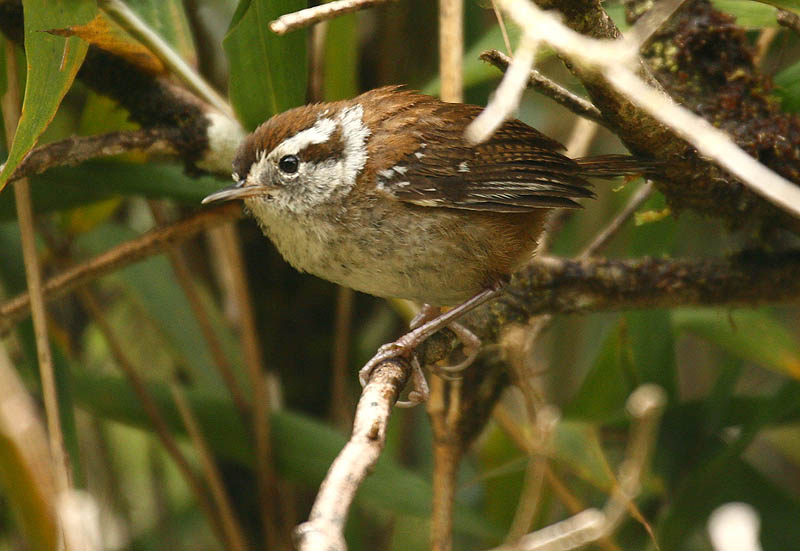

Conservation status
- Least Concern (IUCN 3.1)

Scientific classification
- Kingdom: Animalia
- Phylum: Chordata
- Class: Aves
- Order: Passeriformes
- Family: Troglodytidae
- Genus: Troglodytes
- Species: T. browni

Binomial name
- Troglodytes browni Bangs, 1902

= Timberline wren =

Species of bird

The timberline wren (Troglodytes browni) is a species of bird in the family Troglodytidae. It is found in Costa Rica and western Panama.

== Taxonomy and systematics ==
The timberline wren was formerly placed in the monotypic genus Thryorchilus. A 2024 study found that it is closely related to Troglodytes. Although the species-level phylogeny recovered Thryorchilus as the sister group to Troglodytes, analyses incorporating additional intraspecific lineages placed Thryorchilus within Troglodytes, rendering the latter paraphyletic. In 2026, both the American Ornithological Society and AviList merged Thryorchilus into Troglodytes.

Its taxonomy at the subspecies level is unsettled. The International Ornithological Committee (IOC) considers it to be monotypic. The Cornell Lab of Ornithology's Birds of the World lists three subspecies, but notes that this treatment is disputed and that timberline wren should be "perhaps better considered monotypic." The Clements taxonomy and the Handbook of Birds of the World list the same three subspecies without comment.

The three disputed subspecies are the nominate T. browni browni, T. b. ridgwayi, and T. b. basultoi.

== Description ==
The timberline wren is 10 cm (3.9 in) long and weighs 14 g (0.49 oz). The adult of the nominate subspecies has rich chestnut brown crown and upperparts and a reddish brown tail with thin dark bars. It has a broad gray-white supercilium, a chocolate brown stripe behind the eye, and grayish cheeks with narrow black markings. Its throat and chest are grayish white, its upper belly a mottled grayish white, its lower belly brown, and its flanks and vent area reddish brown. The juvenile is grayer below with a scalloped appearance. T. b. ridgwayi is larger than the nominate and has deeper reddish brown upperparts. T. b. basultoi has a wider supercilium, whitish markings on the upperparts and the sides of its neck, and has whiter underparts.

== Distribution and habitat ==
The timberline wren's range is disjunct, and spans from central Costa Rica south to northern Panama. T. b. ridgwayi is found on Volcán Turrialba, Volcán Irazú, and adjacent areas in central Costa Rica. T. b. basultoi is found in the Cordillera de Dota of south central Costa Rica. The nominate T. b. browni is found on Volcán Barú, Volcán de Chiriquí, and Cerro Copete in western Panama.

The timberline wren inhabits páramo and near-páramo moorland at the upper edge of tree line, and is partial to bamboo thickets. In elevation it mostly ranges between 2,800 and 3,600 m (9,200 and 11,800 ft) but can be found as low as 2,200 m (7,200 ft).

== Behavior ==
=== Feeding ===
The timberline wren typically forages on or near the ground, sometimes fluttering to pick prey from leaves and creeping along mossy branches. Its diet includes small insects, caterpillars, and spiders.

=== Breeding ===
The timberline wren's breeding season in Costa Rica spans from April to June. Its nest is a hollow ball constructed of bamboo leaves lined with finer material. It has a side entrance and is placed 1 to 3 m (3.3 to 9.8 ft) up in bamboo or a shrub. The typical clutch size is two.

=== Vocalization ===
The timberline wren's song is quite different from that of any Troglodytes wren; it is a repeated "series of half a dozen scratchy, warbling notes, lasting 2–3 seconds". Its call is "a harsh scolding 'churr'".

== Status ==
The IUCN has assessed the timberline wren as being of Least Concern. Though it has a restricted range, it is considered common to abundant in its habitat. Much of its range is in national parks and receives little human pressure.
