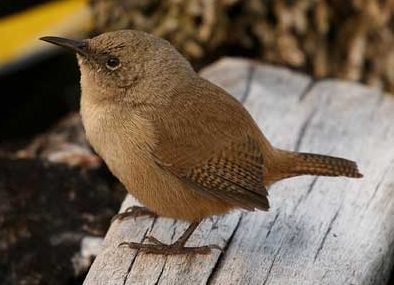

Conservation status
- Least Concern (IUCN 3.1)

Scientific classification
- Kingdom: Animalia
- Phylum: Chordata
- Class: Aves
- Order: Passeriformes
- Family: Troglodytidae
- Genus: Troglodytes
- Species: T. cobbi

Binomial name
- Troglodytes cobbi Chubb, 1909

= Cobb's wren =

Species of bird

Cobb's wren (Troglodytes cobbi) is a fairly small (12-13.5 cm) wren which is endemic to the Falkland Islands. It was formerly classified as a subspecies of the southern house wren but is now commonly considered to be a separate species due to differences in plumage, voice, ecology and morphology.

The scientific and common names commemorate Arthur Cobb, an author from the Falkland Islands.

== Description ==
The plumage is brown, greyer on the head and breast and more rufous on the tail. There are dark bars on the flight feathers and tail. The bill is long, blackish and slightly curved. The main confusion species is the grass wren which is smaller with a shorter bill, buff eyestripe and dark streaks on the back and head. Cobb's wrens have a number of buzzing calls, and their song is a series of jumbled trills and whistles. The song can be heard from August to February and varies between individuals, with different males having different song patterns.

== Behaviour ==
The birds typically inhabit dense stands of tussac grass near the coast. They are often found on beaches, searching among kelp and debris to find small invertebrates such as insects and amphipods. They are tame and can often be approached closely. When disturbed, they prefer to slip away like a mouse between boulders or tussac clumps rather than fly.

=== Breeding ===
The nest is a ball of grass lined with feathers and tussac root fibres. It is built on or near the ground among tussac or in a rock crevice. The eggs are pinkish with small reddish spots, three or four are laid in a clutch. The eggs are laid from early October to December, and two broods are probably raised during the breeding season.

== Status and conservation ==
This wren is restricted to small rat-free islands with a population of only 4,500-8000 pairs (1997/1998 estimate). It is fragmented into small populations, which could disappear if their islands were colonized by rats or cats. The bird's habit of feeding and breeding at ground level makes it very vulnerable to predation, unlike the grass wren which lives higher up and can coexist with predators.

The plight of Cobb's wren was recently brought to broader attention by being featured as Canon's endangered species of the month for the February 2009 issue of National Geographic Magazine.

It has been reclassified as least concern in 2017 by the IUCN thanks to the control of invasive rats on nearby islands.
