= Plain wren =

Plain wren has been split into the following species:

- Cabanis's wren, Cantorchilus modestus
- Canebrake wren, Cantorchilus zeledoni
- Isthmian wren, Cantorchilus elutus
