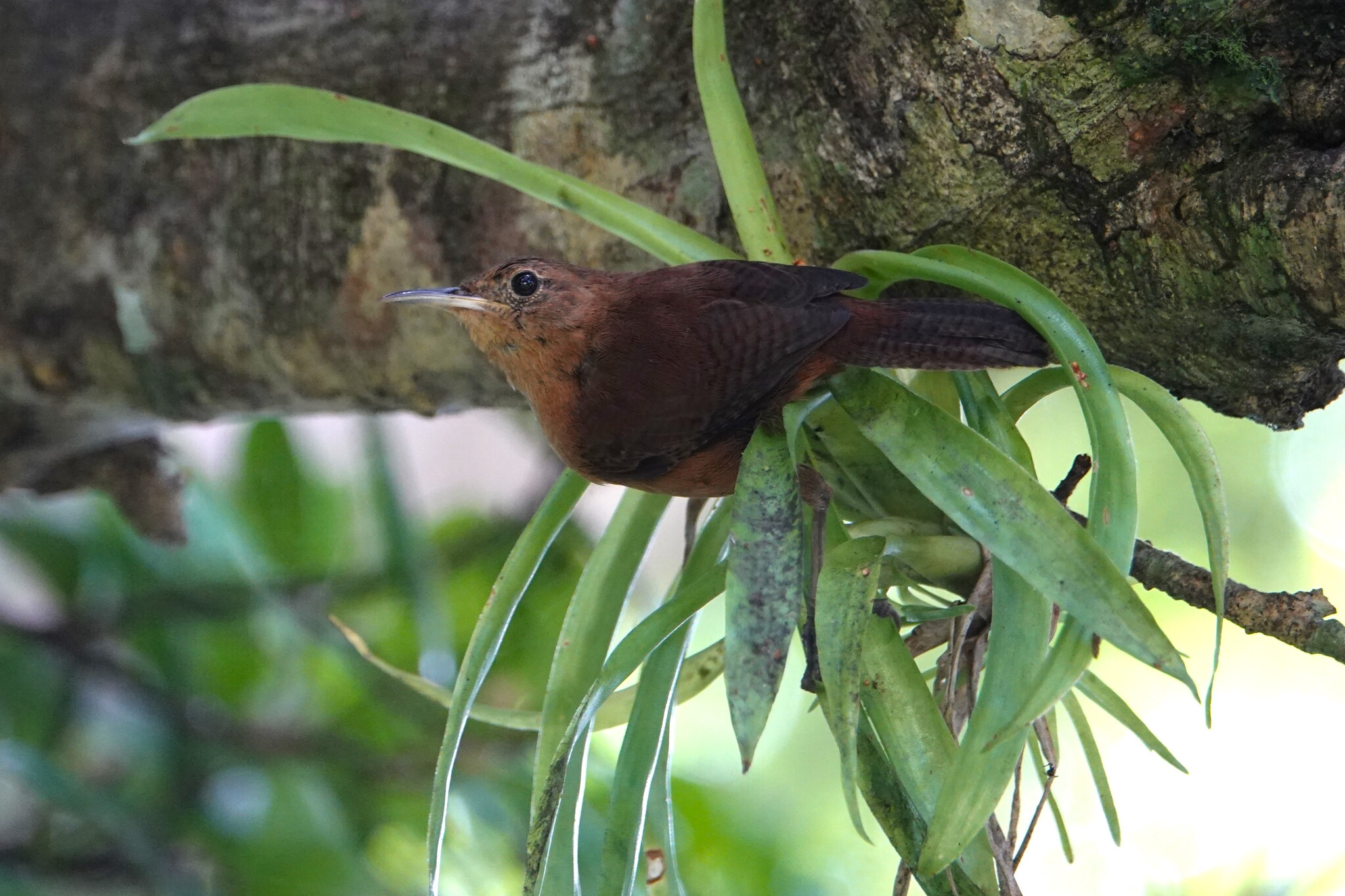

Scientific classification
- Kingdom: Animalia
- Phylum: Chordata
- Class: Aves
- Order: Passeriformes
- Family: Troglodytidae
- Genus: Troglodytes
- Species: T. martinicensis

Binomial name
- Troglodytes martinicensis (Sclater, PL, 1866)

= Kalinago wren =

Species of bird

The Kalinago wren (Troglodytes martinicensis) is a very small passerine bird in the wren family Troglodytidae that is found on the Caribbean island of Dominica. It was formerly also found on the islands of Martinique and Guadeloupe. The name troglodytes means "hole dweller", and is a reference to the bird's tendency to disappear into crevices when hunting insects or to seek shelter. It was formerly considered to be conspecific with the house wren, now renamed the northern house wren (Troglodytes aedon).

== Taxonomy ==
The Kalinago wren was formally described in 1866 by the English zoologist Philip Sclater based on a specimen collected on the island of Martinique. He coined the binomial name Thryothorus martinicensis. The Kalinago wren was formerly considered as conspecific with the house wren (now the northern house wren). It is now treated as a separate species based on differences in plumage, vocalizations and genetics.

Three subspecies are recognised:

- Troglodytes martinicensis guadeloupensis (Cory, 1886) – Guadeloupe (north Lesser Antilles). Possibly extinct.
- Troglodytes martinicensis rufescens (Lawrence, 1877) – Dominica (central Lesser Antilles)
- † Troglodytes martinicensis martinicensis (Sclater, PL, 1866) – Martinique (central Lesser Antilles). Extinct.
