= Northern house wren =

- Connecticut

Conservation status
- Least Concern (IUCN 3.1)

Scientific classification
- Kingdom: Animalia
- Phylum: Chordata
- Class: Aves
- Order: Passeriformes
- Family: Troglodytidae
- Genus: Troglodytes
- Species: T. aedon

Binomial name
- Troglodytes aedon Vieillot, 1809
- Breeding Migration Year-round Nonbreeding

Audio

Species of bird

The northern house wren (Troglodytes aedon) is a very small passerine in the wren family Troglodytidae. It is found in southern Canada, the USA and Mexico. It occurs in most suburban areas in its range. It formerly included many subspecies resident in South America and in the Caribbean that are now considered as separate species. The name troglodytes means "hole dweller", and is a reference to the bird's tendency to disappear into crevices when hunting insects or to seek shelter.

== Taxonomy ==
The northern house wren was formally described in 1809 by the French ornithologist Louis Pierre Vieillot under the current binomial name Troglodytes aedon. The specific epithet is from the Ancient Greek aēdōn meaning "nightingale". The type locality was designated as New York City by Harry Oberholser in 1934. An earlier specific name, domestica in the combination Sylvia domestica, was introduced in 1808 by the American ornithologist Alexander Wilson. This was rarely used and in 1998 to conserve the widely used name aedon, the International Commission on Zoological Nomenclature suppressed the specific name domestica for the purposes of the principle of priority.

Four subspecies are recognised:

- Troglodytes aedon parkmanii Audubon, 1839 – southwest, central south Canada and west, central USA to north Mexico (north Baja California)
- Troglodytes aedon aedon Vieillot, 1809 – southeast Canada and east USA
- Troglodytes aedon cahooni Brewster, 1888 – southeast Arizona (southwest USA) to central Mexico (Nayarit and Zacatecas)
- Troglodytes aedon brunneicollis Sclater, PL, 1858 – central, south Mexico (Jalisco to Coahuila, central Nuevo León)

The following species were formerly considered as subspecies in the house wren complex. The species were split based on the deep genomic divergence and differences in vocalizations and morphology.

- Southern house wren, Troglodytes musculus (includes 21 subspecies)
- Cozumel wren, Troglodytes beani
- Kalinago wren, Troglodytes martinicensis
- St. Lucia wren, Troglodytes mesoleucus
- St. Vincent wren, Troglodytes musicus
- Grenada wren, Troglodytes grenadensis
- Cobb's wren, Troglodytes cobbi

== Description ==
Adult northern house wrens are about 11 to 13 cm (4.3 to 5.1 in) long, with a 15 cm (5.9 in) wingspan and weigh about 10 to 12 g (0.35 to 0.42 oz). Among standard measurements, the wing chord is 4.7 to 5.3 cm (1.9 to 2.1 in), the tail is 3.9 to 4.4 cm (1.5 to 1.7 in), the culmen is 1.1 to 1.3 cm (0.43 to 0.51 in) and the tarsus is 1.6 to 1.8 cm (0.63 to 0.71 in). The subspecies vary greatly, with upper parts ranging from dull greyish-brown to rich rufescent-brown, and the underparts ranging from brown, over buff and pale grey, to pure white. All subspecies have blackish barring to the wings and tail, and some also to the flanks. All subspecies show a faint eye-ring and eyebrow and have a long, thin bill with a blackish upper mandible, and a black-tipped yellowish or pale grey lower mandible. The legs are pinkish or grey. The short tail is typically held cocked.

This bird's rich bubbly song is commonly heard during the nesting season but rarely afterwards. There is marked variation in the song.

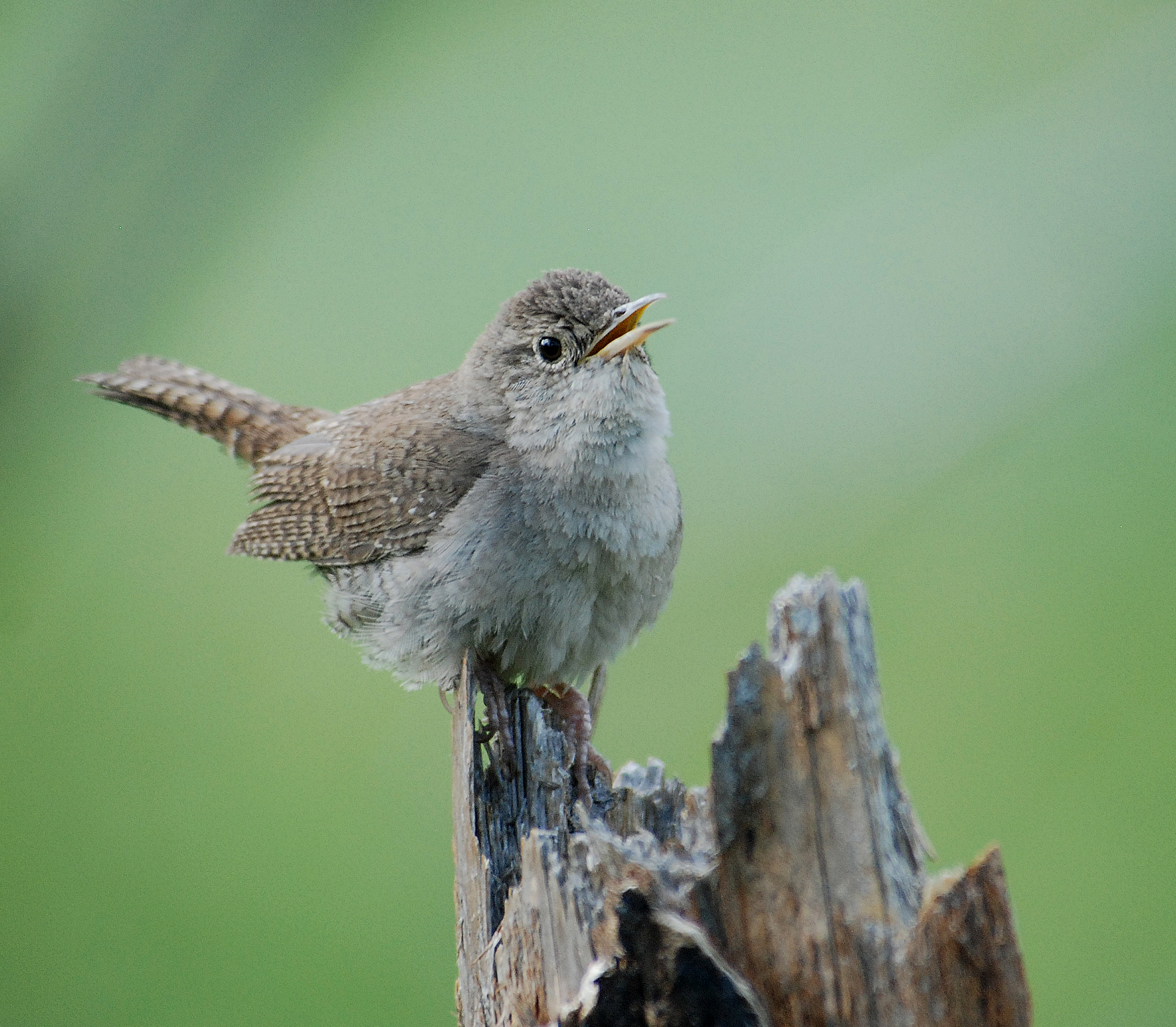
T. a. parkmanii, Bandelier National Monument (New Mexico, USA)

Northern house wren song recorded in Rondeau Provincial Park (Ontario, Canada)

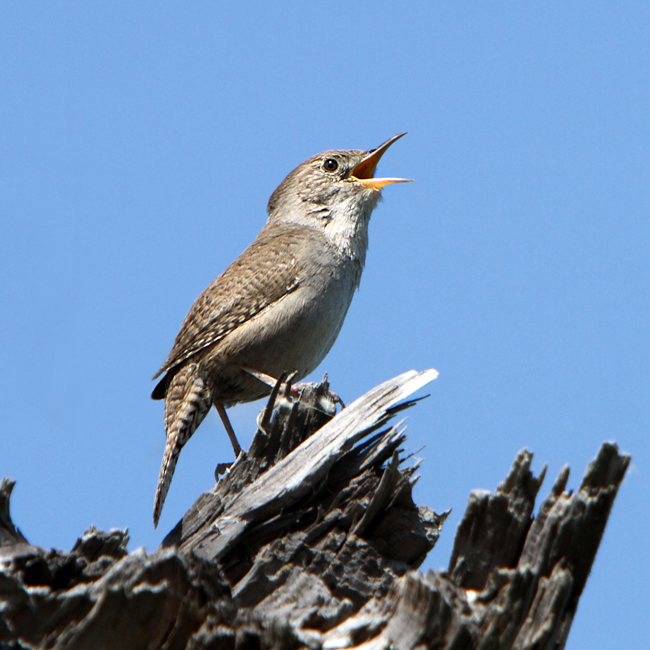
Northern house wren
San Luis Obispo (California, USA)

Northern house wren recorded at Richardson Nature Center, Bloomington, Minnesota

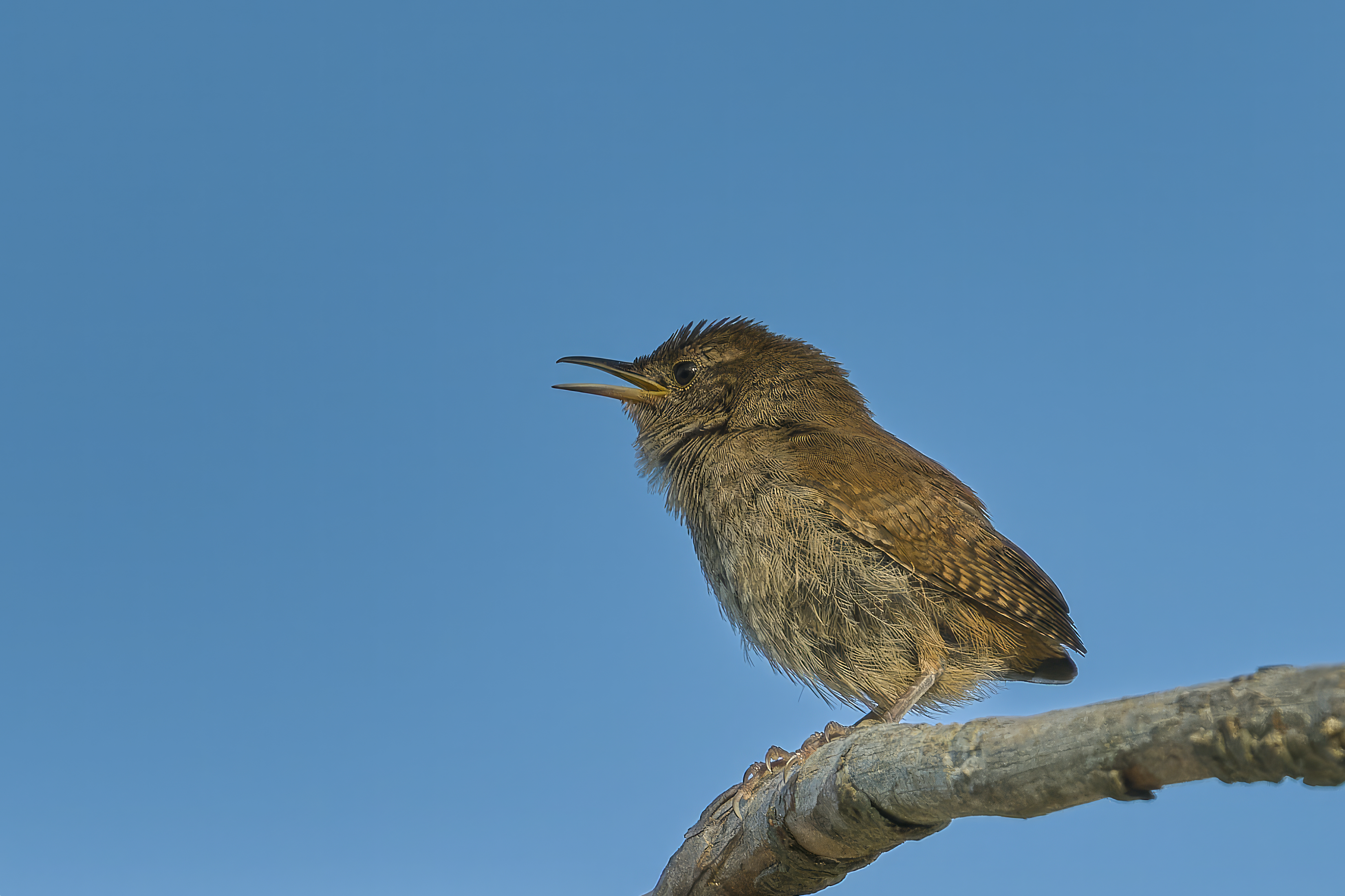
Individual with missing tail feathers, (East Hartford, Connecticut, USA)

== Behavior and ecology ==
Northern house wren
Song; Minnesota

The northern house wren is thought to achieve the highest density in floodplain forests in the western great plains where it uses woodpecker holes as nesting sites. The birds migrate to the southern United States and Mexico for winter. Most return to the breeding grounds in late April to May, and leave for winter quarters again around September to early October. These birds forage actively in vegetation. They mainly eat insects such as butterfly larvae, beetles and bugs, also spiders and snails. Southern house wrens rarely attend mixed-species feeding flocks.

=== Breeding ===
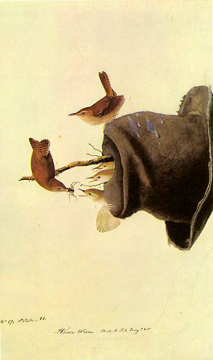
Audubon's illustration of nesting house wrens

The nesting habits do not seem to differ significantly between the northern and southern house wrens. They usually construct a large cup nest in various sorts of cavities, taking about a week to build. The nest is made from small dry sticks and is usually lined with a variety of different materials. These include feather, hair, wool, spider cocoons, strips of bark, rootlets, moss, and trash. The male wren finds dry sticks, which he adds to the nest. Once he is done, the female inspects the nest; but if she does not approve of the construction, she will throw any unwanted sticks to the ground. After this process, the female lines the nest. Nest cavities are usually a few meters above ground at most, but occasionally on cliffs as high up as 15 m (49 ft) and more at least in southern populations; they may be natural or man-made, often using bird houses.

Northern house wrens are feisty and pugnacious animals considering their tiny size. They are known to occasionally destroy the eggs of other birds nesting in their territory by puncturing the eggshell. Females that sang more songs to conspecifics that were simulated by playback lost fewer eggs to ovicide by other wrens. Female bird song in this species is, therefore, thought to have a function in competition and is not only displayed by males. They are also known to fill up other birds' nests within its territory with sticks to make them unusable.

House wren removing the contents of a tree swallow nest from a nest box (Tree swallow not shown).

Adult bringing food for young (note begging calls)

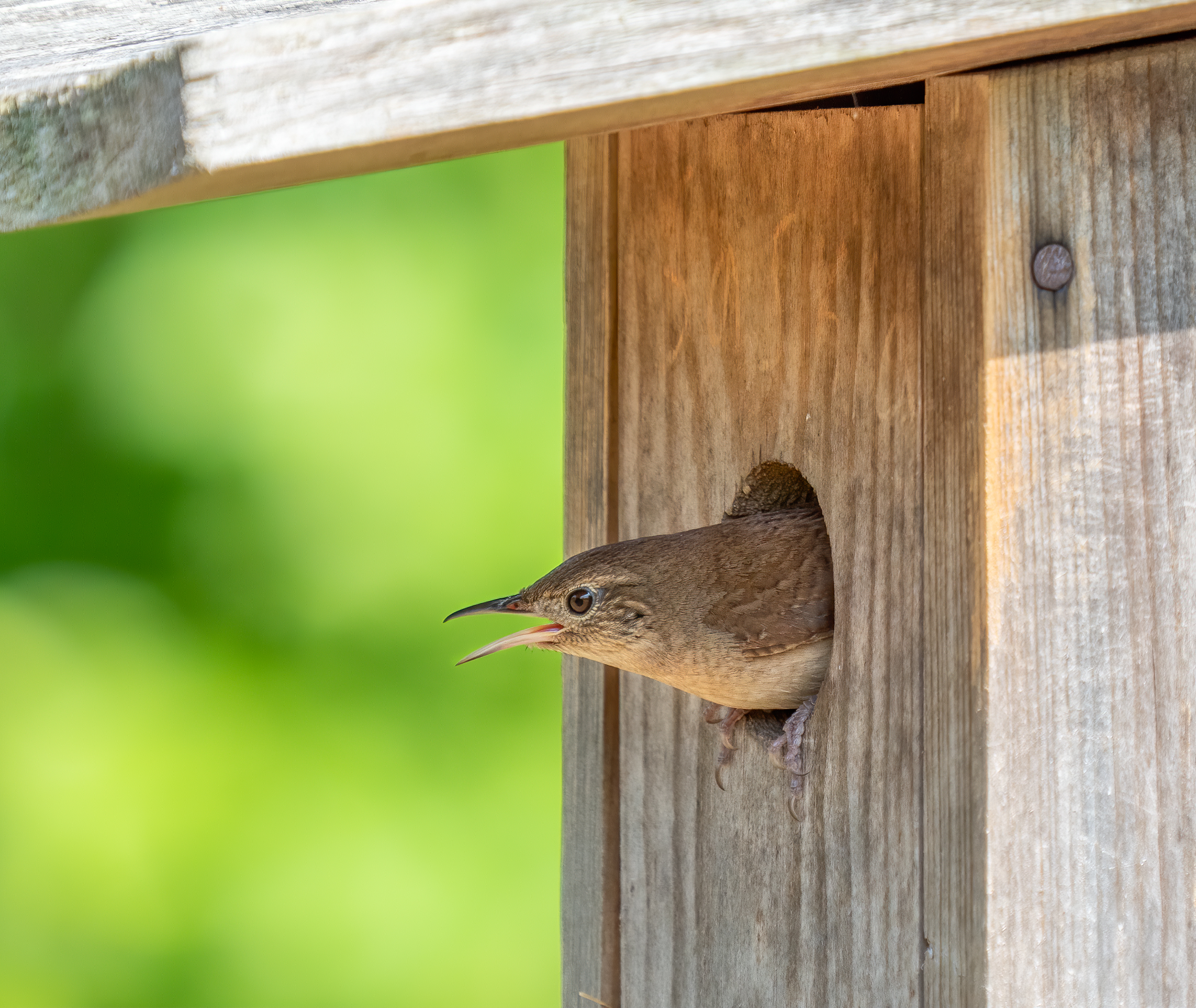
House Wren peering out from a nesting box

Depending on the exact population, the northern house wrens' clutch is usually between two and eight red-blotched cream-white eggs, weighing about 1.4 g (0.05 oz) each and measuring c.17 and 13.4 mm (0.67 and 0.53 in) at the widest points. Only the female incubates these, for around 12–19 days, and she will every now and then leave the nest for various reasons. While she is on the nest, the male provisions her with food. The young, which like all passerines hatch almost naked and helpless, take another 15–19 days or so to fledge. They are fed by both parents, and need plenty of food given their tiny size (see also Bergmann's Rule). As the young near fledging, the parents spend much of their time procuring food for them. Known predators of northern house wrens at the nest include cats, rats, opossums, woodpeckers, foxes, raccoons, squirrels, snakes and owls. Adults away from the nests can usually avoid these predators although both small hawks and owls occasionally take free-flying adult wrens.

Migrant populations are nesting within six weeks of returning from winter quarters, leaving theoretically time for a second brood.

In Washington, D.C. area, northern house wren parents made significantly more feeding trips per hour in suburban backyards compared to rural backyards. Yet rural nestlings grew at a faster rate than their suburban counterparts. In addition, suburban parents spent less time brooding (sitting on the nest) compared to rural parents. Such results suggest that suburban backyard habitats offer house wrens food for nestlings that is inferior in either quality or quantity to what rural habitats offer. Food items may, for example, be smaller in suburban habitats, and force adults to make more trips to the box.

=== Conservation status ===
The house wren may have been displaced somewhat in some northern parts of its range by the introduction of the house sparrow, but is still common and widespread throughout most of North America. It is not considered threatened by the IUCN.

== In culture ==
John James Audubon illustrates the house wren in Birds of America (published, London 1827–38) as Plate 83. The image was engraved and colored by the Robert Havell, London workshops.

Troglodytes Aedon was one of the two pets of King Friday the XIII in Mister Rogers' Neighborhood. Trog, as the King called him, was a wooden wren on a stick, and Trog had his own song. King Friday's other pet was a mockingbird (a wooden mockingbird on a stick) named Mimus Polyglottos (see Neighborhood of Make-Believe).
