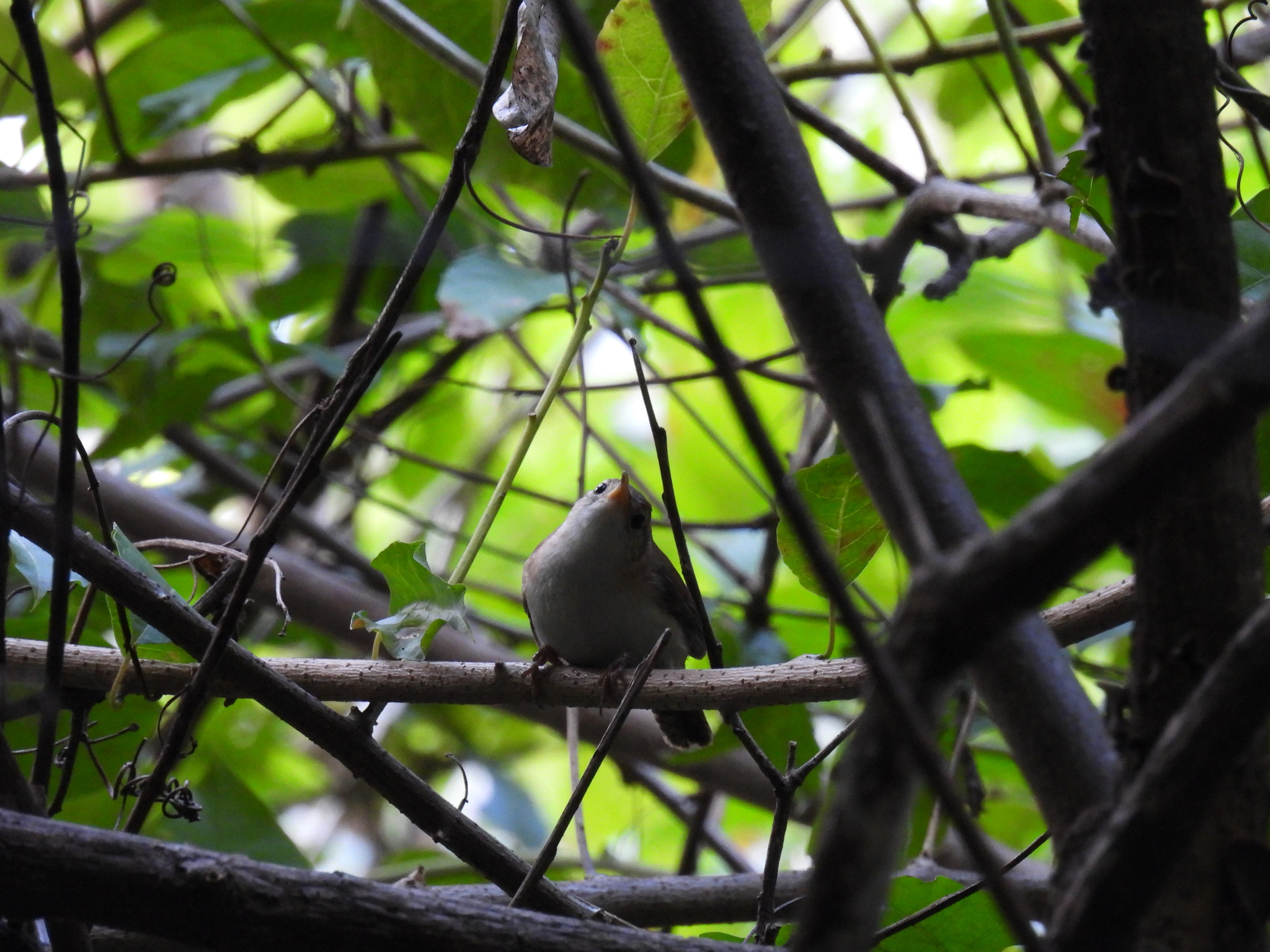

Conservation status
- Not evaluated (IUCN 3.1)

Scientific classification
- Kingdom: Animalia
- Phylum: Chordata
- Class: Aves
- Order: Passeriformes
- Family: Troglodytidae
- Genus: Troglodytes
- Species: T. mesoleucus

Binomial name
- Troglodytes mesoleucus (Sclater, PL, 1876)

= St. Lucia wren =

Species of bird

The St. Lucia wren (Troglodytes mesoleucus) is a very small passerine bird in the wren family Troglodytidae that is found on the Caribbean island of Saint Lucia. The name troglodytes means "hole dweller", and is a reference to the bird's tendency to disappear into crevices when hunting insects or to seek shelter. It was formerly considered to be conspecific with the house wren, now renamed the northern house wren (Troglodytes aedon).

== Taxonomy ==
The St. Lucia wren was formally described in 1876 by the English zoologist Philip Sclater based on a specimen collected by the amateur ornithologist the Reverend John E. Semper on the island of Saint Lucia. Sclater coined the binomial name Thryothorus mesoleucus where the specific epithet is from Ancient Greek μεσολευκος/mesoleukos meaning "middling-white" or "streaked white". The St. Lucia wren was formerly considered to be a subspecies of the house wren, now renamed the northern house wren (Troglodytes aedon). It is now recognised as a separate species based on differences in ecology, behavior, morphology and vocalizations. The species is monotypic: no subspecies are recognised.

== Distribution ==
A survey conducted on St. Lucia using audio playback in 1997 found a total of 59 individuals in four disjunct populations. The authors of the survey estimated that the total population on the island was around 100 birds.
