= Frederick A. Ober =

American naturalist and writer

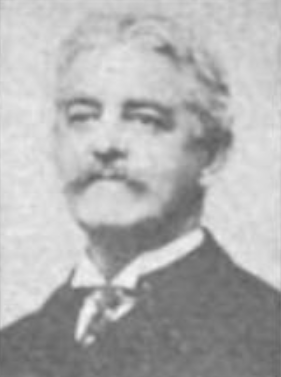
- Born: Frederick Albion Ober; February 13, 1849; Beverly, Massachusetts
- Died: May 31, 1913 (aged 64); Hackensack, New Jersey
- Education: Massachusetts Agricultural College
- Occupations: Naturalist, writer

Frederick Albion Ober (February 13, 1849 - May 31, 1913) was an American naturalist and writer.

== Biography ==
Ober was born February 13, 1849, in Beverly, Massachusetts. He received a common school education. While yet a boy, he evinced a fondness for natural history: he collected nearly all the birds of New England and noted their habits. From 1862 to 1866 he had an occupation as shoemaker. Subsequently, he attended the Massachusetts Agricultural College (now the University of Massachusetts Amherst) but due to the lack of funds he was forced to leave the college after a short time. From 1867 to 1870 he worked as employee in a drugstore and again as shoemaker.

In 1872, he abandoned his business pursuits to hunt in Florida. In 1874 he made a second trip, successfully explored Lake Okeechobee, and published in periodicals a description of the lake and its shores. From 1876 to 1878 he made ornithological surveys to the Lesser Antilles where he discovered 22 bird taxa new to science. Two of them – the Lesser Antillean flycatcher and the Montserrat oriole – were named in his honor by his colleague George Newbold Lawrence.

In 1881, moved by a desire to see the vestiges of early American civilization, he journeyed through Mexico, and during that and two subsequent trips gathered the material for several books. On his return from various explorations he prepared accounts of his travels at the request of scientific societies, and later a series of popular lectures, illustrated with photographic views, projected by the magic lantern. His lectures, originally delivered before the Lowell Institute in Boston, included "Mexico, Historical and Picturesque", "Ancient Cities of Mexico", "The Mexican Indian", "Adventures in the West Indies", and "Through Florida with Gun and Camera".

Ober was elected a member of the American Antiquarian Society in 1893.

Ober died May 31, 1913, in his home in Hackensack, New Jersey. He was among the founders of The Explorers Club in 1904.

== Literary works (selected) ==
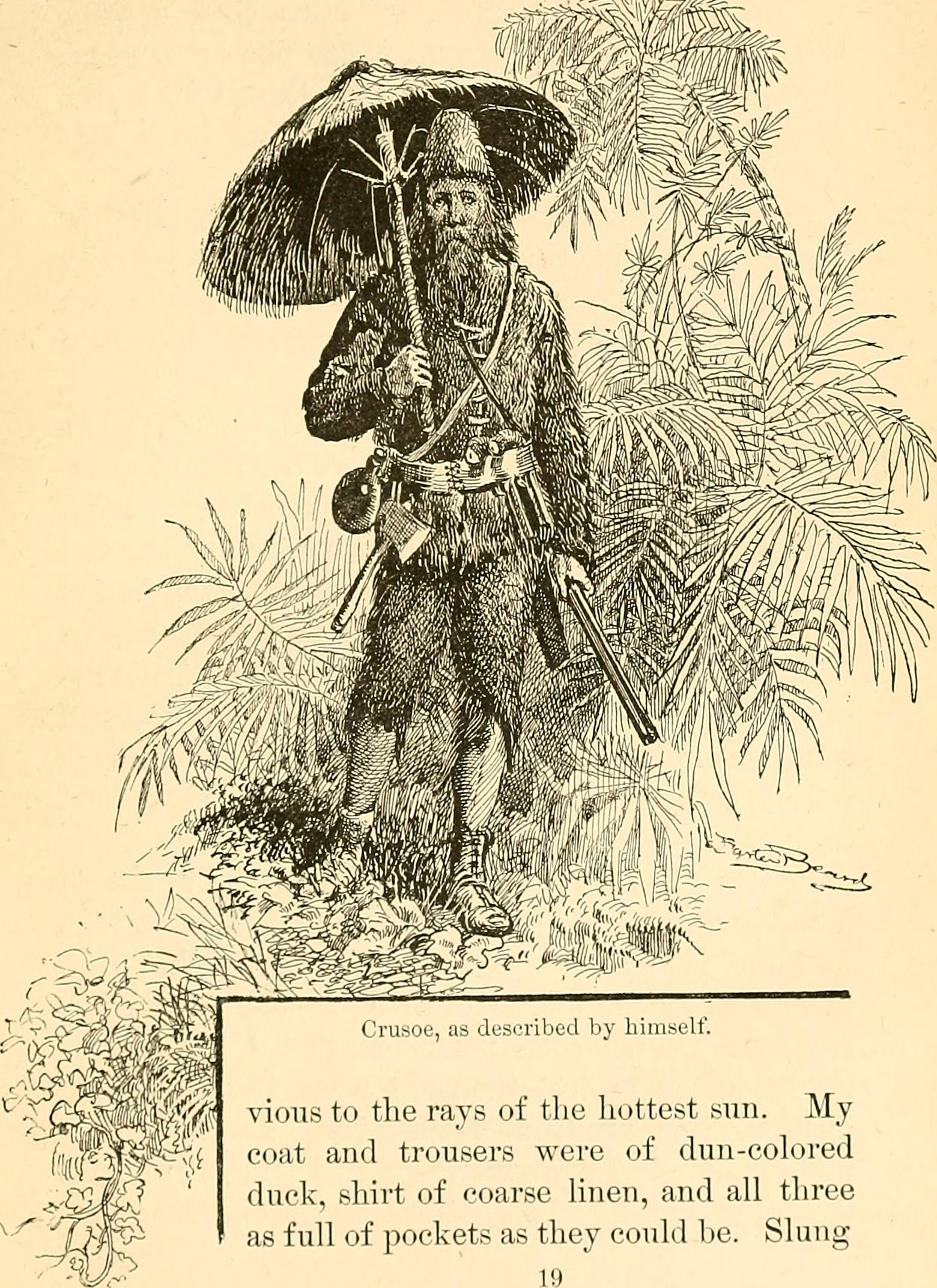
Image from Crusoe's Island; a bird-hunter's story (1898)

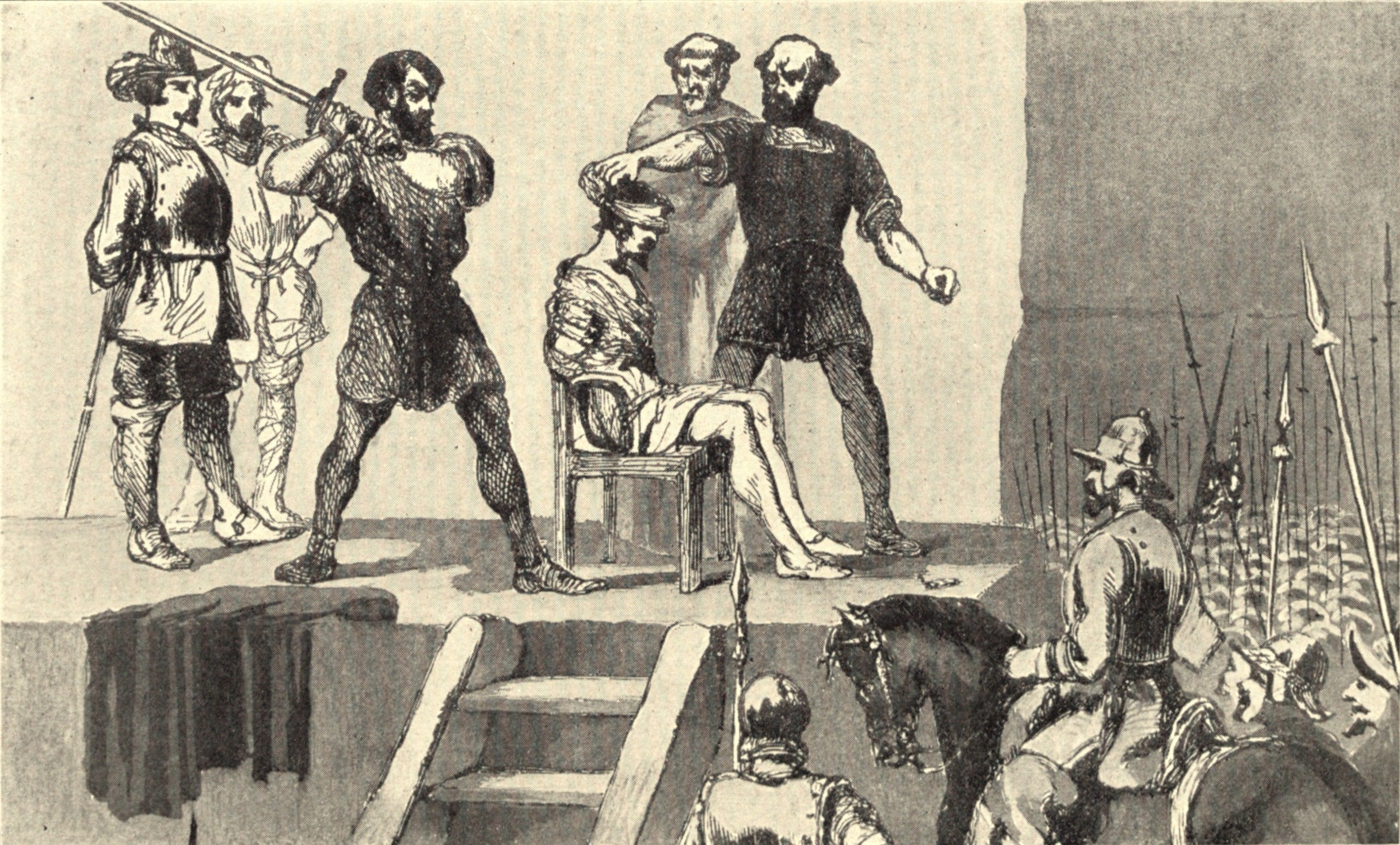
Image from the execution of Vasco Núñez de Balboa in Vasco Nuñez de Balboa (1906)

During his writing career, which lasted 30 years, he wrote more than 40 books, mostly travel books, but also bird books, and biographies about Amerigo Vespucci, Hernán Cortés, and Israel Putnam.

- 1880: Camps in the Caribbees: The Adventures of a Naturalist in the Lesser Antilles; 2nd edition, 1886
- 1883: The Silver City, together with Cacique John
- 1884: Travels in Mexico and Life among the Mexicans
- 1888: A Boy's Adventures in the West Indies
- 1895: Josephine, empress of the French
- 1897: Under the Cuban Flag: Or, The Cacique's Treasure
- 1898: Crusoe's Island; a bird-hunter's story
- 1900: The Storied West Indies
- 1901: The last of the Arawaks: a story of adventure on the Island of San Domingo
- 1903: The Navy Boys' Cruise with Columbus or The Adventures of Two Boys Who Sailed with the Great Admiral in His Discovery of America
- 1904: Our West Indian neighbors: the islands of the Caribbean Sea, "America's Mediterranean": their picturesque features, fascinating history, and attractions for the traveller, nature-lover, settler and pleasure seeker
- 1904: "Old Put" the patriot
- 1905: Hernando Cortés, Conqueror of Mexico
- 1906: Vasco Nuñez de Balboa
- 1906: Pizarro and the conquest of Peru
- 1906: Ferdinand De Soto and the invasion of Florida
- 1907: Heroes of American History: Amerigo Vespucci
- 1908: A Guide to the West Indies and Bermudas: With Maps and Many Illustrations
- 1910: Mexico, Central America, and West Indies
- 1912: A Child's History Of Spain

== Notes ==
- Young Folks History Of Mexico, 1883
