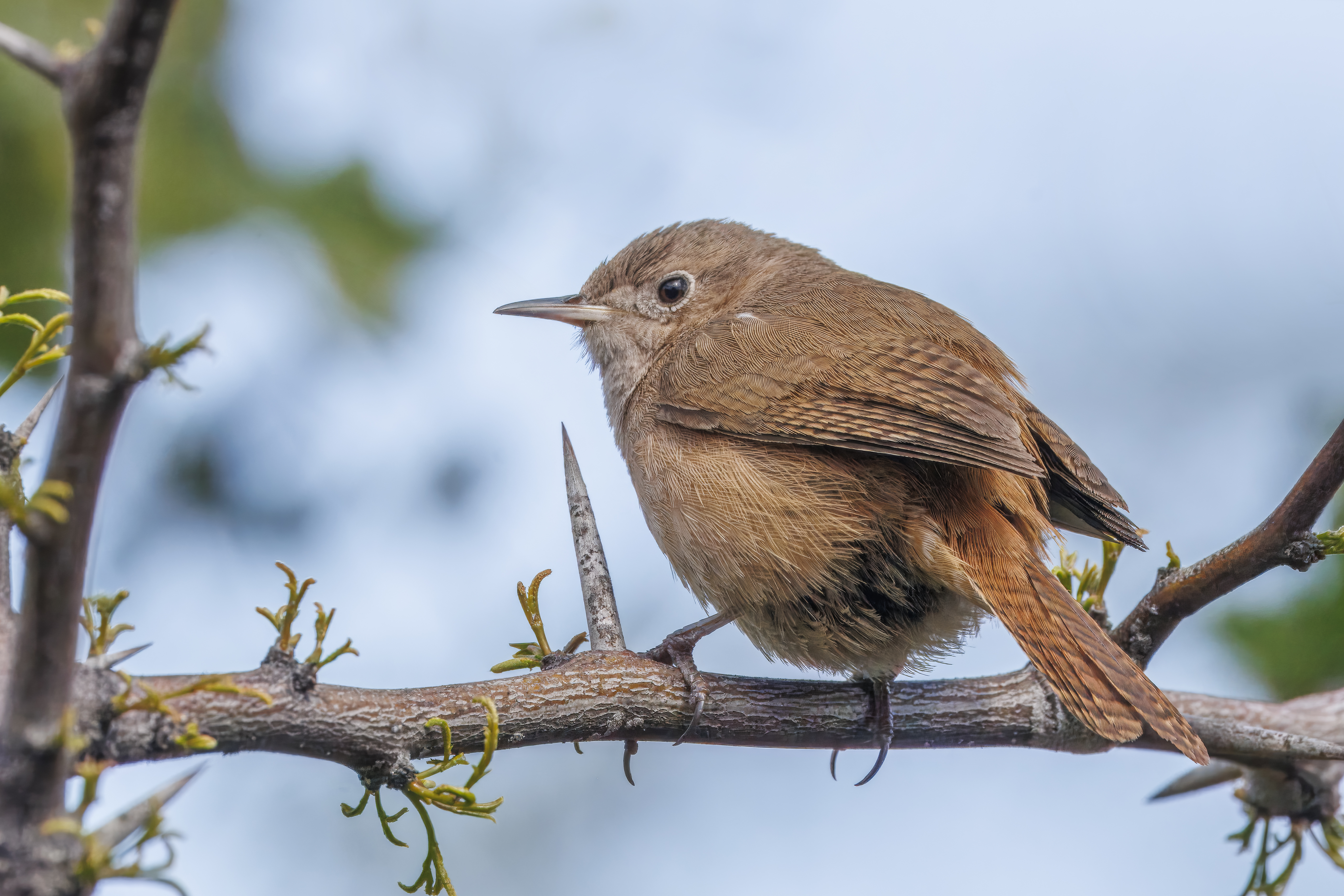
- Southern house wren in Santiago, Chile

Scientific classification
- Kingdom: Animalia
- Phylum: Chordata
- Class: Aves
- Order: Passeriformes
- Family: Troglodytidae
- Genus: Troglodytes
- Species: T. musculus

Binomial name
- Troglodytes musculus Naumann, JF, 1823

Audio
- Song recorded in Petropolis (Rio de Janeiro, Brazil)

= Southern house wren =

Species of bird

The southern house wren (Troglodytes musculus) is a very small passerine bird in the wren family Troglodytidae. It is found from southern Mexico to southern Chile and southern Argentina. The name troglodytes means "hole dweller", and is a reference to the bird's tendency to disappear into crevices when hunting insects or to seek shelter. It was formerly considered to be conspecific with the northern house wren (Troglodytes aedon).

== Taxonomy ==
The southern house wren was formally described in 1823 by the German naturalist Johann Andreas Naumann under the binomial name Troglodytes musculus. He specified the type locality as the state of Bahia in eastern Brazil. The specific epithet is Latin meaning "little mouse". The southern house wren was formerly considered to be part of the house wren complex that also included the northern house wren and six insular forms. The southern house wren was split from the complex based on the deep genetic divergence, differences in vocalizations and differences in morphology.

Twenty-one subspecies are recognised:

- T. m. intermedius Cabanis, 1861 – south Mexico (southeast Veracruz and west Chiapas) to central Costa Rica
- T. m. peninsularis Nelson, 1901 – Yucatán Peninsula (southeast Mexico)
- T. m. inquietus Baird, SF, 1864 – southwest Costa Rica to east Panama
- T. m. carychrous Wetmore, 1957 – Coiba (off south Panama)
- T. m. pallidipes Phillips, AR, 1986 – Pearl Islands (off southeast Panama)
- T. m. tobagensis Lawrence, 1888 – Tobago (north of Trinidad)
- T. m. atopus Oberholser, 1904 – north Colombia
- T. m. effutitus Wetmore, 1958 – Guajira Pen. (north Colombia) and northwest Venezuela
- T. m. striatulus (Lafresnaye, 1845) – west, central Colombia and northwest Venezuela
- T. m. columbae Stone, 1899 – east Colombia and west Venezuela
- T. m. clarus Berlepsch & Hartert, EJO, 1902 – Venezuela (except the west), east Colombia and the Guianas to northeast Peru and north, west Brazil
- T. m. albicans Berlepsch & Taczanowski, 1884 – southwest Colombia and west Ecuador
- T. m. musculus Naumann, JF, 1823 – central, east Brazil to northeast Argentina and east Paraguay
- T. m. bonariae Hellmayr, 1919 – extreme southeast Brazil, Uruguay and northeast Argentina
- T. m. puna Berlepsch & Stolzmann, 1896 – Peru and northwest Bolivia
- T. m. audax Tschudi, 1844 – west Peru
- T. m. carabayae Chapman & Griscom, 1924 – central, south Peru
- T. m. tecellatus d'Orbigny & Lafresnaye, 1837 – southwest Peru and north Chile
- T. m. rex Berlepsch & Leverkühn, 1890 – central Bolivia to north Argentina and west Paraguay
- T. m. atacamensis Hellmayr, 1924 – north, central Chile
- T. m. chilensis Lesson, RP, 1830 – south Chile and south Argentina

== Behaviour ==
In Argentina, southern house wrens dispersed more frequently between-seasons than within a season, with females dispersing more often than males. Widowed and single males dispersed more frequently than paired males, whilst within-season divorce increased the breeding success of females but not males.

In the subtropical montane forest of northwestern Argentina and similar habitat, the southern house wren breeds in the rainy summer months from late October to late December. Brood loss due to predation was found to be light in the Southern Andean Yungas, with predation of nestling young being almost insignificant.
