= Rufous-naped wren =

Rufous-naped wren has been split into three species:

- Veracruz wren, Campylorhynchus rufinucha
- Sclater's wren, Campylorhynchus humilis
- Rufous-backed wren, Campylorhynchus capistratus
- note: the name rufous-naped wren is retained for the Veracruz wren by some taxonomic authorities. Some taxonomic authorities do not recognize the split, including the American Ornithological Society.
