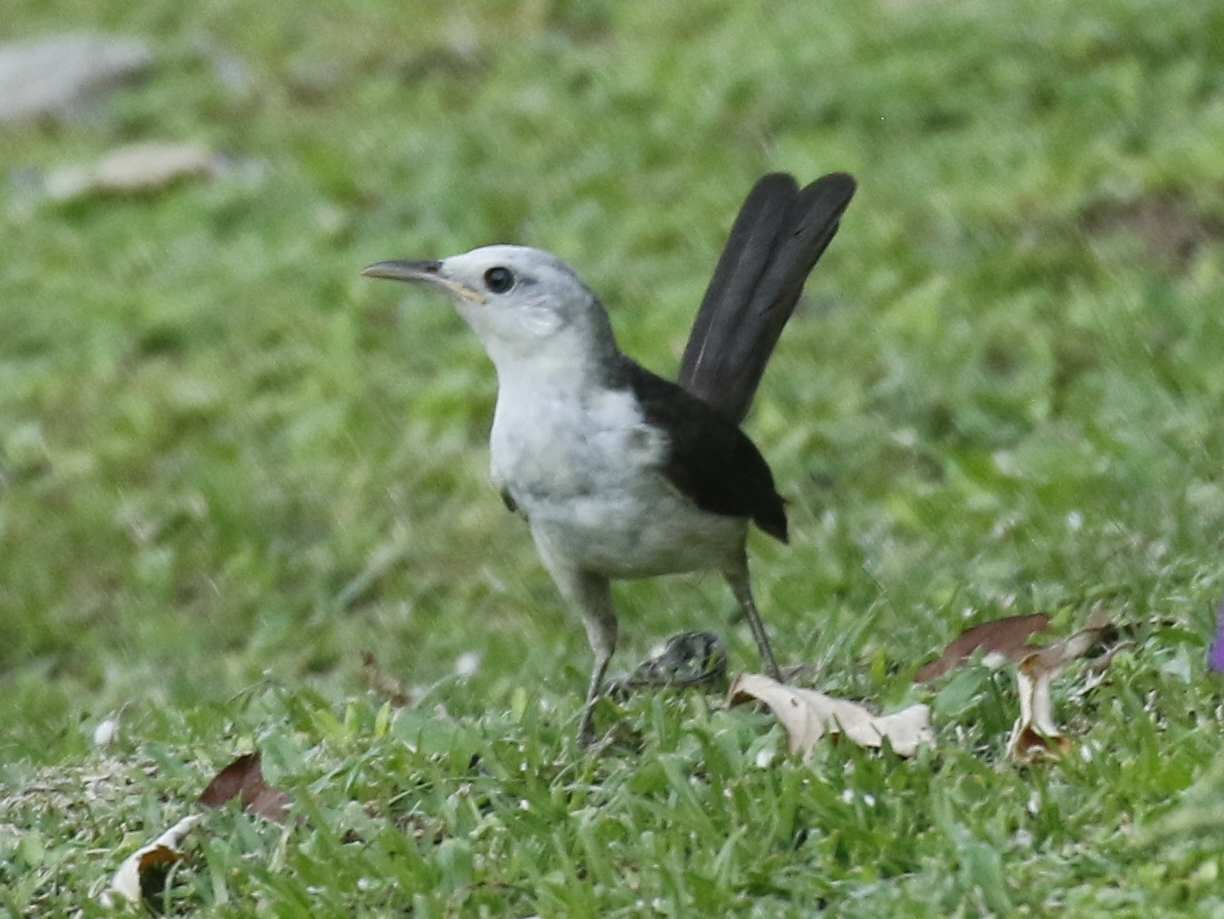

Conservation status
- Least Concern (IUCN 3.1)

Scientific classification
- Kingdom: Animalia
- Phylum: Chordata
- Class: Aves
- Order: Passeriformes
- Family: Troglodytidae
- Genus: Campylorhynchus
- Species: C. albobrunneus

Binomial name
- Campylorhynchus albobrunneus (Lawrence, 1862)

= White-headed wren =

Species of bird

The white-headed wren (Campylorhynchus albobrunneus) is a species of bird in the family Troglodytidae. It is found in Colombia and Panama.

== Taxonomy and systematics ==
The white-headed wren has in the past been treated as conspecific with band-backed wren (Campylorhynchus zonatus) and with thrush-like wren (C. turdinus). Molecular analyses refuted that treatment and confirmed that it is a separator species.

The white-headed wren has two recognized subspecies, the nominate C. a. albobrunneus and C. a. harterti.

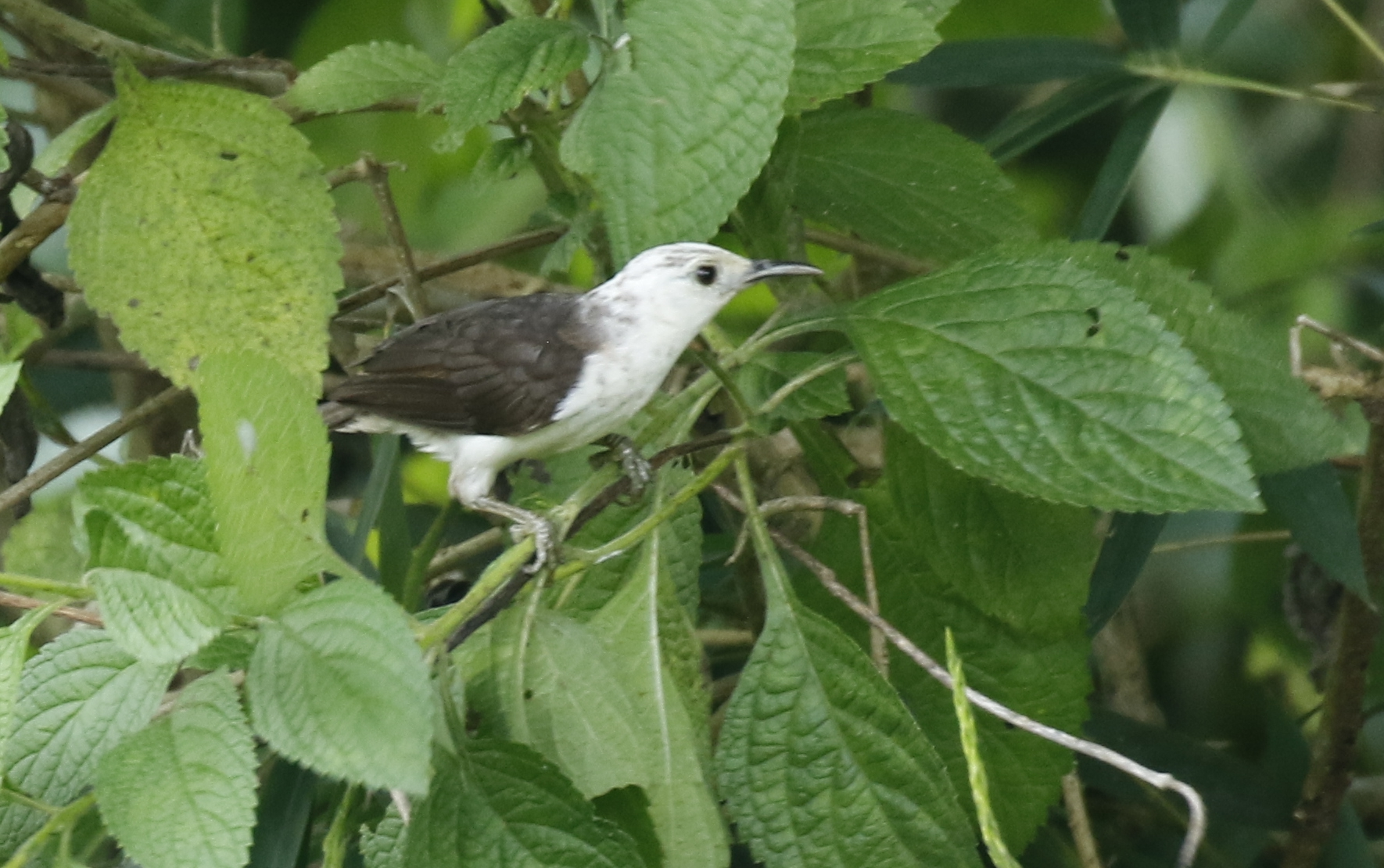
Canopy Camp - Darien, Panama

== Description ==
The white-headed wren is 18.5 cm (7.3 in) long and weighs 27.5 to 39 g (0.97 to 1.38 oz). It is unique among wrens, having essentially only two colors in large blocks. The sexes are alike. The nominate adult's entire head, nape, and underside from the throat through the lower belly are pure white. The rest of the body but for the vent area is dull blackish brown; the vent is gray-brown. C. a. harterti differs from the nominate only in having darker upperparts. The juvenile has a streaky gray-brown crown, a buffy face and underparts, and a pale cinnamon belly.

== Distribution and habitat ==
The nominate white-headed wren is found only in Panama, from the Canal Zone east to western Darién Province. C. a. harterti is found from eastern Darién through western Colombia almost to Ecuador. It inhabits both pristine and disturbed humid forest with epiphytes. In elevation it ranges from sea level to 1,500 m (4,900 ft).

== Behavior ==
=== Feeding ===
There are few data about the white-headed wren's diet though it is known to include beetles, ants, and other insects. It forages mostly in the middle to upper levels of the forest and frequently investigates epiphytes. It often forages in small groups that are probably extended families.

=== Breeding ===
A few white-headed wren nests have been found; they are globular with a side entrance and sited in epiphytes. No other information on its breeding phenology has been published.

=== Vocalization ===
Both sexes of the white-headed wren sing "a series of harsh scratchy notes" . Its call is "a harsh 'kahk'" .

== Status ==
The IUCN has assessed the white-headed wren as being of Least Concern. Though its population has not been quantified, it appears to be stable.
