= Insurgente José María Morelos y Pavón National Park =

National park in Mexico

- IUCN category II (national park)
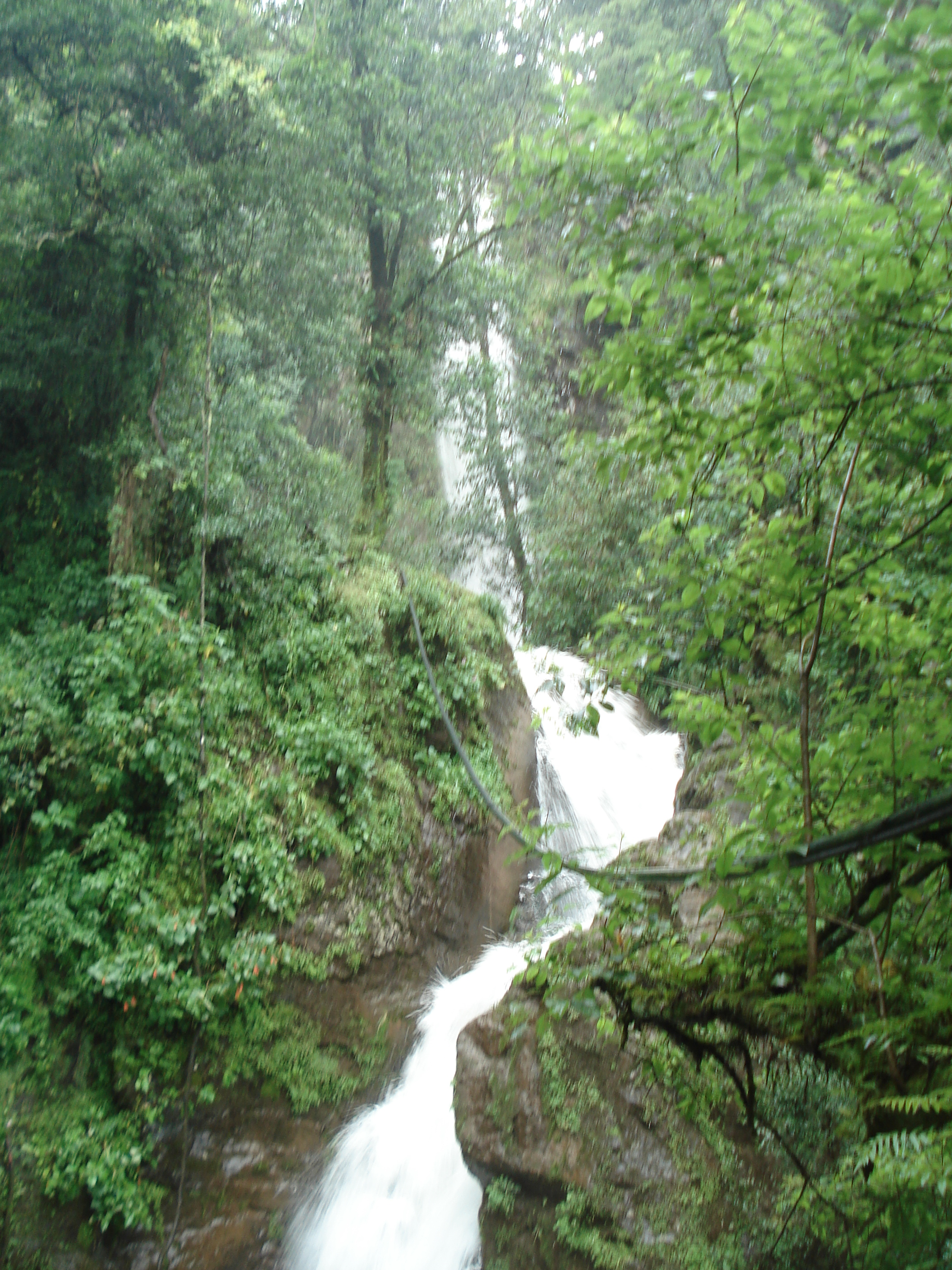

- Location within Mexico
- Location: Michoacán, Mexico
- Coordinates: 19°36′N 100°31′W
- Area: 71.92 km^{2} (27.77 sq mi)
- Designation: National park
- Designated: 1939
- Administrator: National Commission of Natural Protected Areas

Insurgente José María Morelos y Pavón National Park is a national park in Michoacán state of central Mexico. It protects 71.92 km^{2} in the mountains of the Trans-Mexican Volcanic Belt.

== Geography ==
Insurgente José María Morelos National Park is located 23 km east of Morelia, in the municipalities of Charo and Tzitzio. It is in a portion of the Trans-Mexican Volcanic Belt known as the Sierra de Mil Cumbres or Sierra de Otzumatlán. The park includes hills, mountains, stream valleys, with elevations ranging from 1340 to 2640 meters. Streams in the northern part of the park drain northwards to empty into Lake Cuitzeo, and those in the southern part of the park drain southwards into the basin of the Balsas River. Springs in the northern part of the park, including El Puerto de la Conveniencia, Ojo de Agua La Laja, and Ojo de Agua de Los Tepetates, are sources of the El Salto stream and waterfall.

== Climate ==
The climate ranges from warm subhumid at lower elevations to temperate subhumid at higher elevations, with a mean annual temperature of 18 C. Mean annual rainfall is 1692 mm.

== Flora and fauna ==
The park is in the Trans-Mexican Volcanic Belt pine–oak forests ecoregion, and plant communities in the park include oak forests, pine–oak forests, and pine–oak forests, and riparian forests.

172 birds species of birds have been recorded in the park. They include the banded quail (Philortyx fasciatus), buff-collared nightjar (Antrostomus ridgwayi), dusky hummingbird (Phaeoptila sordida), gray-barred wren (Campylorhynchus megalopterus), spotted wren (Campylorhynchus gularis), ruddy-capped nightingale-thrush (Catharus frantzii), rufous-backed thrush (Turdus rufopalliatus), golden vireo (Vireo hypochryseus), chestnut-sided shrike-vireo (Vireolanius melitophrys), red-headed tanager (Piranga erythrocephala), rusty-crowned ground sparrow (Melozone kieneri), and black-headed siskin (Spinus notatus). The slaty finch (Haplospiza rustica) has been recorded in the park, but may be transient rather than resident.

38 mammal species and 18 reptile species have been recorded in the park. Nine species of amphibians, including four salamander species and five species of frogs, inhabit the streams that flow into Lake Cuitzeo.

== Conservation ==
President Lázaro Cárdenas established the park by decree on 22 February 1939. The park is named for José María Morelos (1765–1815), a rebel leader in the Mexican War of Independence.

A portion of the park is designated for recreation, and the rest for conservation. The recreational portion of the park is a popular weekend destination for residents of Morelia.

Most of the land within the park is privately owned or controlled by ejidos, and was not purchased by the government after the park was declared. Parts of the park are claimed by the Indigenous Community of Charo, the Community of Zurumbeneo, and small landowners of El Vaquerito, and these land claims are unresolved.

Threats to the park include unauthorized logging on private lands within the park and water pollution.
