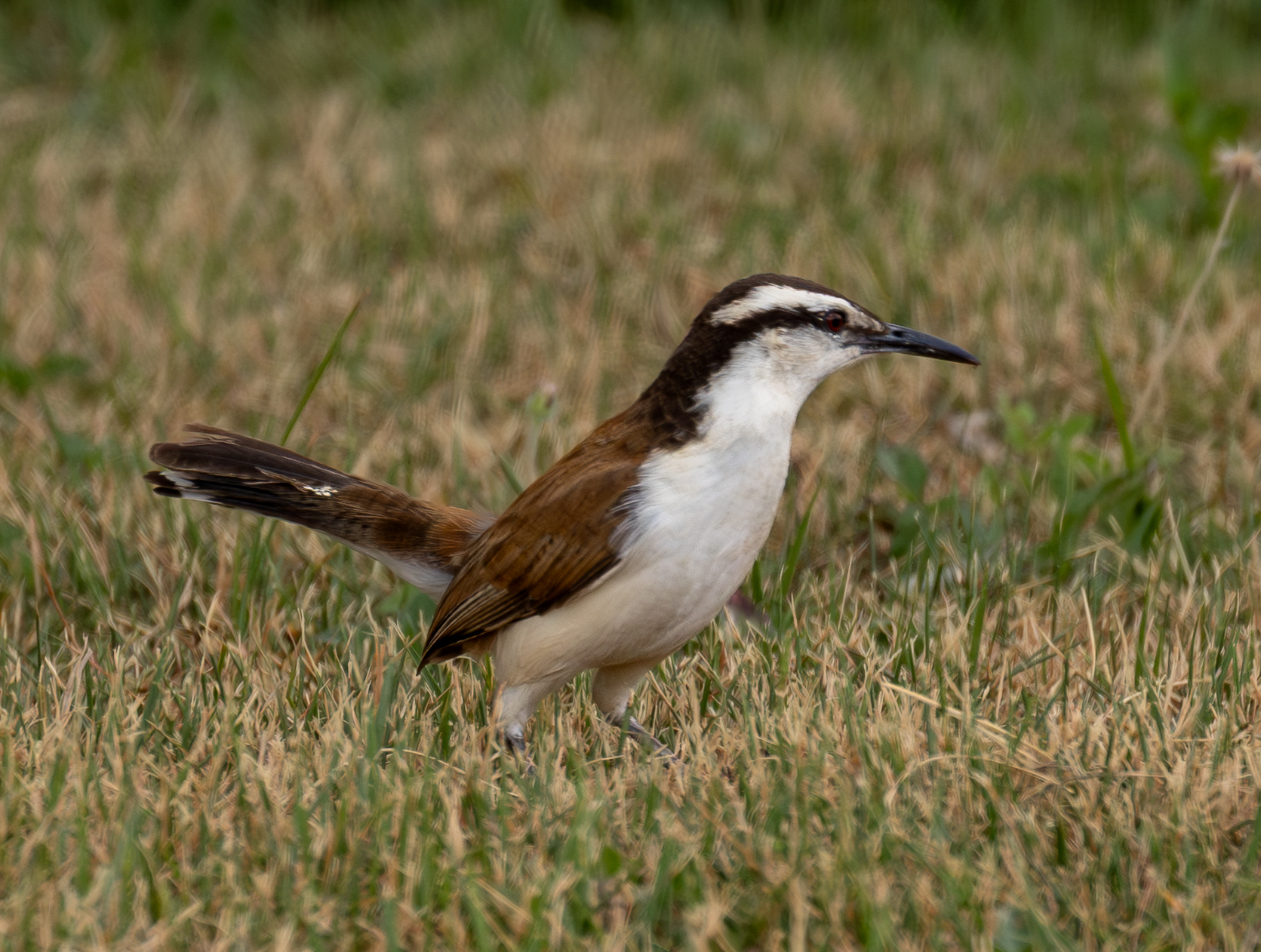
- in Boa Vista, Roraima, Brazil

Conservation status
- Least Concern (IUCN 3.1)

Scientific classification
- Kingdom: Animalia
- Phylum: Chordata
- Class: Aves
- Order: Passeriformes
- Family: Troglodytidae
- Genus: Campylorhynchus
- Species: C. griseus

Binomial name
- Campylorhynchus griseus (Swainson, 1838)

= Bicolored wren =

Species of bird endemic to South America

The bicolored wren (Campylorhynchus griseus) is a species of bird in the family Troglodytidae. It is found in Colombia, Venezuela, Guyana, and Brazil.

== Taxonomy and systematics ==
The bicolored wren has six subspecies:

- C. g. albicilius Bonaparte (1854)
- C. g. bicolor Pelzeln (1875)
- C. g. griseus Swainson (1837)
- C. g. minor Cabanis (1851)
- C. g. pallidus Phelps & Phelps Jr. (1947)
- C. g. zimmeri Borrero & Hernandez-Camacho (1958)

It has sometimes been treated as conspecific with the giant wren (Campylorhynchus chiapensis) and might form a superspecies with it. Subspecies C. g. zimmeri has been considered to be an intergrade between albicius and the nominate griseus.

== Description ==
The bicolored wren is the largest South American wren and second in size only to the giant wren overall in the family. It is 21 to 22 cm (8.3 to 8.7 in) long and weighs 37 to 46.5 g (1.31 to 1.64 oz). The sexes are similar. The nominate adults have dark chocolate crowns and napes and their upperparts a paler chocolate. An off-white supercilium separates a dark brown stripe through the eye from the crown and the rest of the face is also white. Their tail is dark brown; all of the tail feathers except the middle pair have a white band near the end. The throat and the entire underparts are white. C. g. albicilius is rustier than the nominate; so is bicolor but its rump is lighter. C. g. minor is smaller and its nape and upper back are blackish brown. C. g. pallidus is paler and more gray than the nominate and has a darker crown. The juveniles are grayer than the adults; their caps are mottled gray-brown and their underparts are grayish white.

== Distribution and habitat ==
The subspecies of bicolored wren are distributed thus:

- C. g. albicilius, northern Colombia and northwestern Venezuela with a few records in far eastern Panama
- C. g. bicolor, western Colombia's upper Magdalena Valley and west slope of the Eastern Andes
- C. g. griseus, eastern Venezuela through western and southwestern Guyana into extreme northern Brazil
- C. g. minor, northern Venezuela and eastern Colombia
- C. g. pallidus, southern Venezuela's Amazonas State
- C. g. zimmeri, central Colombia's Huila and Tolima Departments

The bicolored wren inhabits areas with scattered trees and bushes and is completely absent from forests and wide open areas. C. g. bicolor occurs in arid thorn scrub and the other subspecies in significantly more humid areas. In elevation it ranges up to 2,100 m (6,900 ft) in Colombia and 1,600 m (5,200 ft) in Venezuela.

== Behavior ==
=== Feeding ===
The bicolored wren forages in trees and on the ground. Its diet is primarily invertebrates, but it also eats vegetable matter such as berries.

=== Breeding ===
The bicolored wren has two breeding seasons in Venezuela, January to March and May to August; its season in Colombia has not been determined. It is a cooperative breeder with blood relatives helping the nesting pair defend the nest and feed the young. The nest is a dome made of grass and other fibers and with a side entrance. It is placed high in a tree and is well concealed. The wren sometimes also uses old domed nests of other species. The clutch size is three to five.

=== Vocalization ===
The male bicolored wren's song is "a series of multiple loud gurgling notes" . The female's is similar but includes a trill. The songs vary widely across the species' range. Its calls are "mostly harsh and grating" .

== Status ==
The IUCN has assessed the bicolored wren as being of Least Concern. It is "common or abundant [and can] tolerate substantial modification of habitat, provided that sufficient bushes remain; for example, [it] can co-exist with agricultural practices such as ranching.
