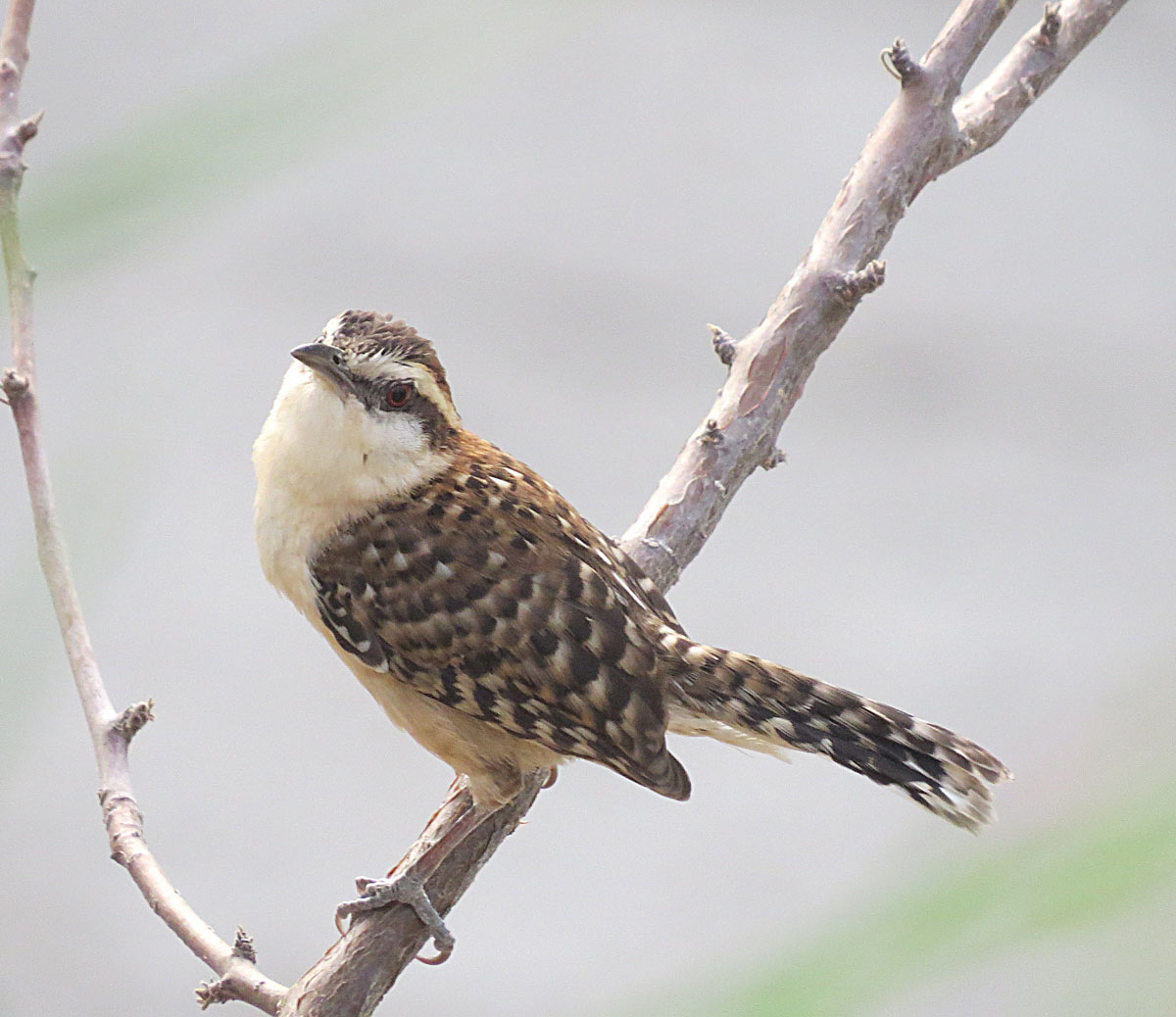

Conservation status
- Least Concern (IUCN 3.1)

Scientific classification
- Domain: Eukaryota
- Kingdom: Animalia
- Phylum: Chordata
- Class: Aves
- Order: Passeriformes
- Family: Troglodytidae
- Genus: Campylorhynchus
- Species: C. humilis

Binomial name
- Campylorhynchus humilis PL Sclater, 1857

= Russet-naped wren =

Species of bird

The russet-naped wren (Campylorhynchus humilis), also known as Sclater's wren, is a songbird of the family Troglodytidae. It is endemic to Mexico.

== Taxonomy and systematics ==
What is now the russet-naped wren was previously treated as one of eight subspecies of rufous-naped wren (Campylorhynchus rufinucha). A 2009 publication proposed that Campylorhynchus rufinucha (sensu lato) be split into three species and the International Ornithological Committee (IOC) accepted the splits. What had been C. r. humilis was elevated to species status as the russet-naped wren. The reduced C. rufinucha received the new English name Veracruz wren and the other six subspecies became subspecies of C. capistratus, the rufous-backed wren.

BirdLife International (BLI) has implemented the split but retains the English name rufous-naped wren for C. rufinucha. However, the North American Classification Committee of the American Ornithological Society (NACC/AOS) and the Clements taxonomy have not accepted the split as of early 2021.

== Description ==
The adult russet-naped wren has a reddish brown crown, blackish lores and eyestripe, and a white supercilium. Its nape and back are chestnut and its tail is gray-brown with darker bars and a white tip. Its chin and throat are white, the chest pale buff, and its belly a darker buff with faint blackish bars on the flanks. The juvenile is similar but its supercilium is buffy white, the back a duller chestnut, and the markings on the back less distinct.

== Distribution and habitat ==
The russet-naped wren is endemic to Mexico. It is found in from Colima south through Michoacán to Guerrero and east to Oaxaca and southwestern Chiapas. It inhabits lowland dry tropical forest, primarily in arid and semi-arid areas. It also occurs in human-modified landscapes and coastal mangroves. In elevation it ranges from sea level to 1,200 m (3,900 ft).

== Behavior ==
=== Feeding ===
The russet-naped wren preys on a variety of insects.

=== Breeding ===
Little information is available on the russet-naped wren's breeding phenology. It is known to build a globular nest with a side entrance like the other species in its genus. It typically constructs them in thorny bushes and trees, especially Vachellia collinsii.

=== Vocalization ===
An example of the russet-naped wren song is . An example call is .

=== Status ===
The IUCN has assessed Sclater's wren as being of Least Concern. "The population has not been quantified since the species was split" but "is suspected to be stable in the absence of evidence for any declines or substantial threats."
