= Tzitzio =

- Municipality
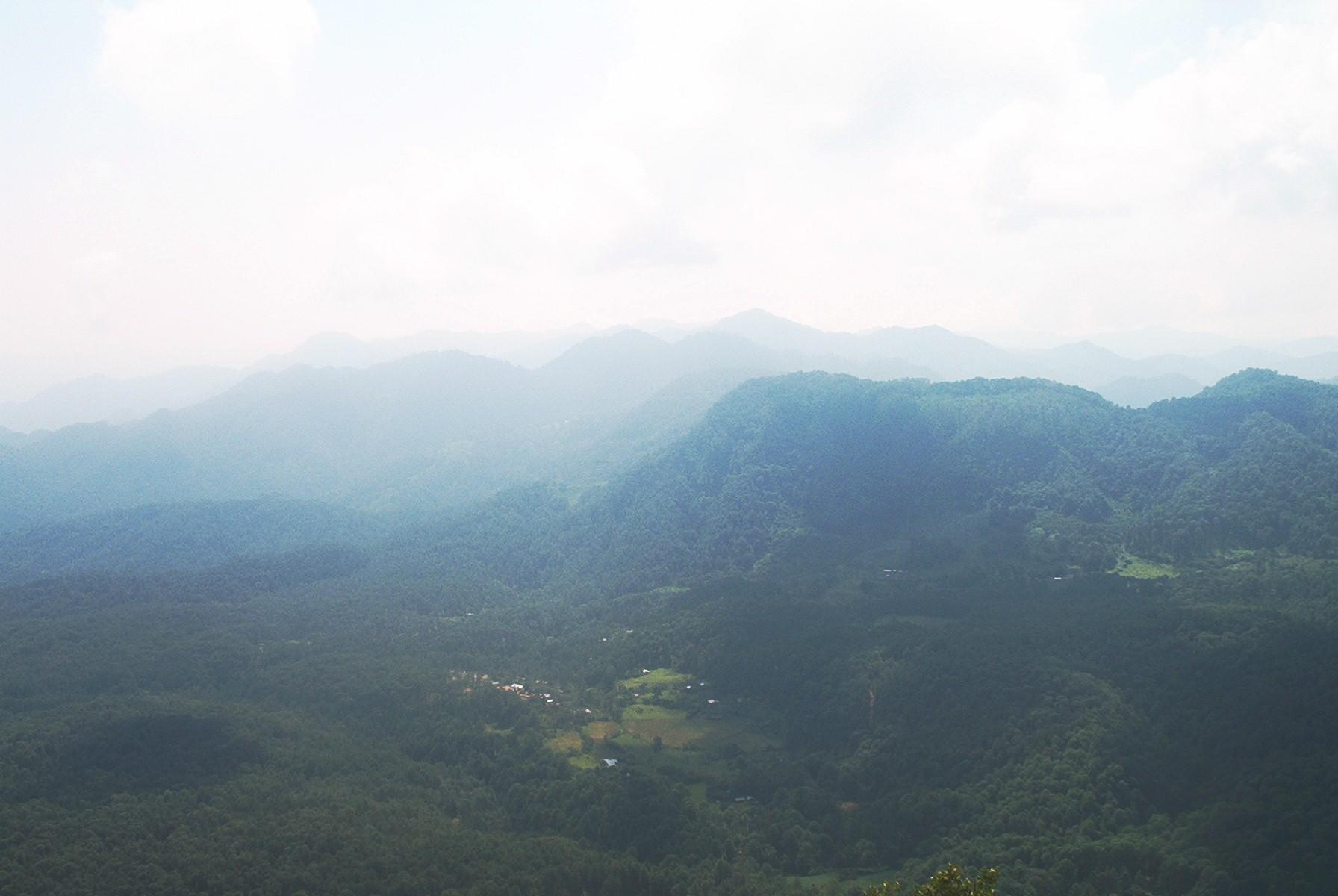
- Landscape in northwestern Tzitzio

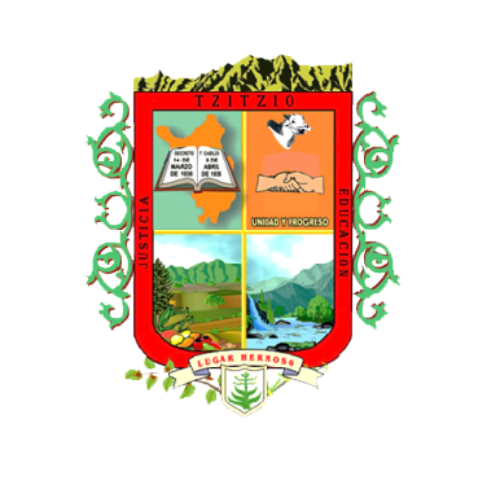
- Coat of arms

- Location of Tzitzio Tzitzio (Mexico)
- Coordinates: 19°35′08″N 100°55′23″W
- Country: Mexico
- State: Michoacán
- Established: 6 April 1936
- Seat: Tzitzio

Government
  - President: Emilia Herrera Sánchez

Area
  - Total: 944.133 km^{2} (364.532 sq mi)
- Elevation (of seat): 1,541 m (5,056 ft)

Population (2010 Census)
  - Total: 9,166
  - Estimate (2015 Intercensal Survey): 8,966
  - Density: 9.708/km^{2} (25.14/sq mi)
  - Seat: 1,072
- Time zone: UTC-6 (Central)
- Postal codes: 61330–61368
- Area code: 459
- Website: Official website

Tzitzio is a municipality in the Mexican state of Michoacán, located approximately 30 kilometres (19 mi) southeast of the state capital of Morelia.

== Geography ==
The municipality of Tzitzio is located in the Balsas Depression in northeast Michoacán at an elevation between 600 and 2,400 metres (2,000–7,900 ft). It borders the municipalities of Charo and Indaparapeo to the north, Queréndaro to the northeast, Hidalgo to the east, Tuzantla to the southeast, Tiquicheo to the south, Madero to the west, and Morelia to the northwest. The municipality covers an area of 944.133 square kilometres (364.532 sq mi) and comprises 1.61% of the state's area.

As of 2009, the land cover in Tzitzio consists of temperate forest (63%), tropical forest (33%) and grassland (1%). Another 2% of the land is used for agriculture and less than 0.1% is urbanized. Most of Tzitzio drains into the Purungueo River, which runs north to south through the municipality and drains into the Cutzamala River just upstream of El Gallo Reservoir. Some of the western parts of the municipality drain into the Carácuaro River. The southeastern corner of Insurgente José María Morelos National Park extends into Tzitzio near its municipal seat.

Tzitzio's climate varies from temperate in the north to tropical in the south, with rain falling in the summer. Average temperatures in the municipality range between 14 and 28 °C (57–82 °F), and average annual precipitation ranges between 800 and 1,300 millimetres (31–51 in).

Climate data for Tzitzio weather station at 19°34′57″N 100°55′26″W, 1565 m above sea level (1981–2010 averages, 1951–2010 extremes)
Month	Jan	Feb	Mar	Apr	May	Jun	Jul	Aug	Sep	Oct	Nov	Dec	Year
Record high °C (°F)	37.5 (99.5)	35.5 (95.9)	39.0 (102.2)	40.0 (104.0)	39.0 (102.2)	37.0 (98.6)	36.0 (96.8)	36.0 (96.8)	35.5 (95.9)	36.0 (96.8)	35.0 (95.0)	37.0 (98.6)	40.0 (104.0)
Mean daily maximum °C (°F)	24.5 (76.1)	26.3 (79.3)	28.6 (83.5)	30.3 (86.5)	30.6 (87.1)	27.7 (81.9)	25.6 (78.1)	25.6 (78.1)	25.3 (77.5)	25.5 (77.9)	25.5 (77.9)	24.7 (76.5)	26.7 (80.1)
Daily mean °C (°F)	17.1 (62.8)	18.5 (65.3)	20.4 (68.7)	22.4 (72.3)	23.3 (73.9)	22.0 (71.6)	20.7 (69.3)	20.5 (68.9)	20.3 (68.5)	20.0 (68.0)	19.0 (66.2)	17.5 (63.5)	20.1 (68.2)
Mean daily minimum °C (°F)	9.8 (49.6)	10.8 (51.4)	12.3 (54.1)	14.5 (58.1)	15.9 (60.6)	16.2 (61.2)	15.7 (60.3)	15.4 (59.7)	15.3 (59.5)	14.5 (58.1)	12.6 (54.7)	10.3 (50.5)	13.6 (56.5)
Record low °C (°F)	1.0 (33.8)	1.5 (34.7)	6.0 (42.8)	1.5 (34.7)	7.0 (44.6)	4.3 (39.7)	6.0 (42.8)	1.5 (34.7)	8.0 (46.4)	1.5 (34.7)	2.5 (36.5)	2.5 (36.5)	1.0 (33.8)
Average precipitation mm (inches)	63.7 (2.51)	20.9 (0.82)	6.1 (0.24)	10.9 (0.43)	51.7 (2.04)	207.7 (8.18)	362.9 (14.29)	291.7 (11.48)	242.0 (9.53)	152.3 (6.00)	61.7 (2.43)	46.7 (1.84)	1,518.3 (59.78)
Average rainy days (≥ 1 mm)	3.5	1.5	1.1	2.3	5.9	17.8	24.6	23.3	21.5	13.2	4.3	2.9	121.9
Source: Servicio Meteorológico Nacional

== History ==
Tzitzio is a word of Chichimeca origin meaning "beautiful place". In 1831 it was a tenencia in the municipality of Indaparapeo. Its inhabitants produced sugarcane, guava, sapote, and other tropical fruits, and wove chiquihuites or baskets. It was made an independent municipality in 1936.

== Administration ==
The municipal government comprises a president, a councillor (Spanish: síndico), and seven trustees (regidores), four elected by relative majority and three by proportional representation. The current president of the municipality is Emilia Herrera Sánchez.

== Demographics ==
In the 2010 Mexican Census, the municipality of Tzitzio recorded a population of 9166 inhabitants living in 2046 households. The 2015 Intercensal Survey estimated a population of 8966 inhabitants in Tzitzio.

INEGI lists 271 localities in the municipality, of which only the municipal seat, also known as Tzitzio, is classified as urban. It recorded a population of 1072 inhabitants in the 2010 Census. The most populated locality in the municipality is the village of Tafetán, which recorded a population of 1784 inhabitants in the 2010 Census.

== Economy ==
Tzitzio's economy is based on agriculture. Major activities include cattle farming and the cultivation of corn, tomatoes, sugarcane, and fruits such as mango, guava, plum and papaya.
