= Charo Municipality =

Municipality in Michoacán, Mexico

Coordinates: 19°45′N 101°03′W

Charo
- Municipality
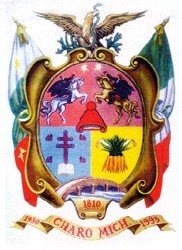
- Coat of arms

- Location in Mexico Charo (Mexico)
- Country: Mexico
- State: Michoacán
- Demonym: (in Spanish)
- Time zone: UTC−6 (CST)

Charo is a municipality located in the Mexican state of Michoacán. The municipality has an area of 322.50 square kilometres (0.29% of the surface of the state) and is bordered to the north by Tarímbaro and Álvaro Obregón, to the east by Indaparapeo, to the south by Tzitzio, and to the west and southwest by Morelia. The municipality had a population of 19,417 inhabitants according to the 2005 census. Its municipal seat is the city of the same name.

The economy of the municipality is mostly based on ranching and agriculture, with maize, carrots and beans the main crops.

In pre-Hispanic times the area was inhabited by the Matlatzinca people, also known locally as Pirindas, who were allies of the Purépecha, the dominant force in the region at the time. Originally from the Toluca Valley, they were allowed to settle here by the cazonci Tzitzipandáquare, who had enlisted their aid in fighting the Teco people of the western borders of his empire.

A portion of Insurgente José María Morelos y Pavón National Park lies in the municipality.

== See also ==
- Municipalities of Michoacán
