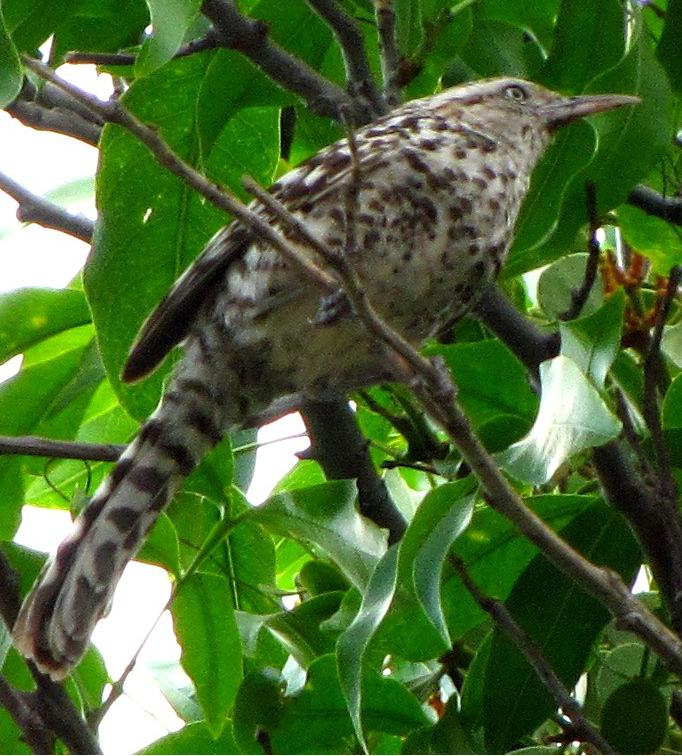

Conservation status
- Least Concern (IUCN 3.1)

Scientific classification
- Kingdom: Animalia
- Phylum: Chordata
- Class: Aves
- Order: Passeriformes
- Family: Troglodytidae
- Genus: Campylorhynchus
- Species: C. nuchalis

Binomial name
- Campylorhynchus nuchalis Cabanis, 1847

= Stripe-backed wren =

Species of bird endemic to South America

The stripe-backed wren (Campylorhynchus nuchalis) is a bird found in the savannas of northern Colombia and central Venezuela. It lives in dry, riparian woodland, or farmlands, and is found at heights up to 800 m.

== Breeding ==
The stripe-backed wren has attracted considerable scientific attention because it is a good example of co-operative breeding. It lives in groups ranging from 2 to 10 adult birds. Of these, only one pair breeds, laying eggs at the beginning of the rainy season (May to September). However, all members of the group participate in defence of the territory, and in feeding the young both in the nest and after fledging. They therefore qualify as helpers at the nest.

The non-breeding members of the group are usually offspring or siblings of the current breeding parents. After one or two seasons, females normally leave their natal groups and join another nest as helpers, typically in a neighbouring territory. Males, however, usually remain at their natal nest and if they survive will inherit the position of breeding male (though under some circumstances they too disperse). If the current breeding male dies or is removed, the next oldest male in the group normally takes over its position.

This breeding system may have evolved as a result of kin selection, but in addition it has been shown by Wiley and Rabenold (1984) that the males' behaviour of "queueing" for the status of breeding male can be an evolutionarily stable strategy provided some plausible conditions are met. Formally, the situation has the characteristics of a prisoner's dilemma game that is played repeatedly between the same partners, and in this case "defection" - jumping the queue - would not be advantageous.

Some of the calls of stripe-backed wrens show individual variations that are consistent from father to son. This is a potential example of the formation of a dialect in bird song. The distinctive family calls seem to be used to maintain social contact between members of the co-operatively breeding group.

As would be expected in a species where both sexes share in parental care, the stripe-backed wren shows no sexual dimorphism in appearance.
