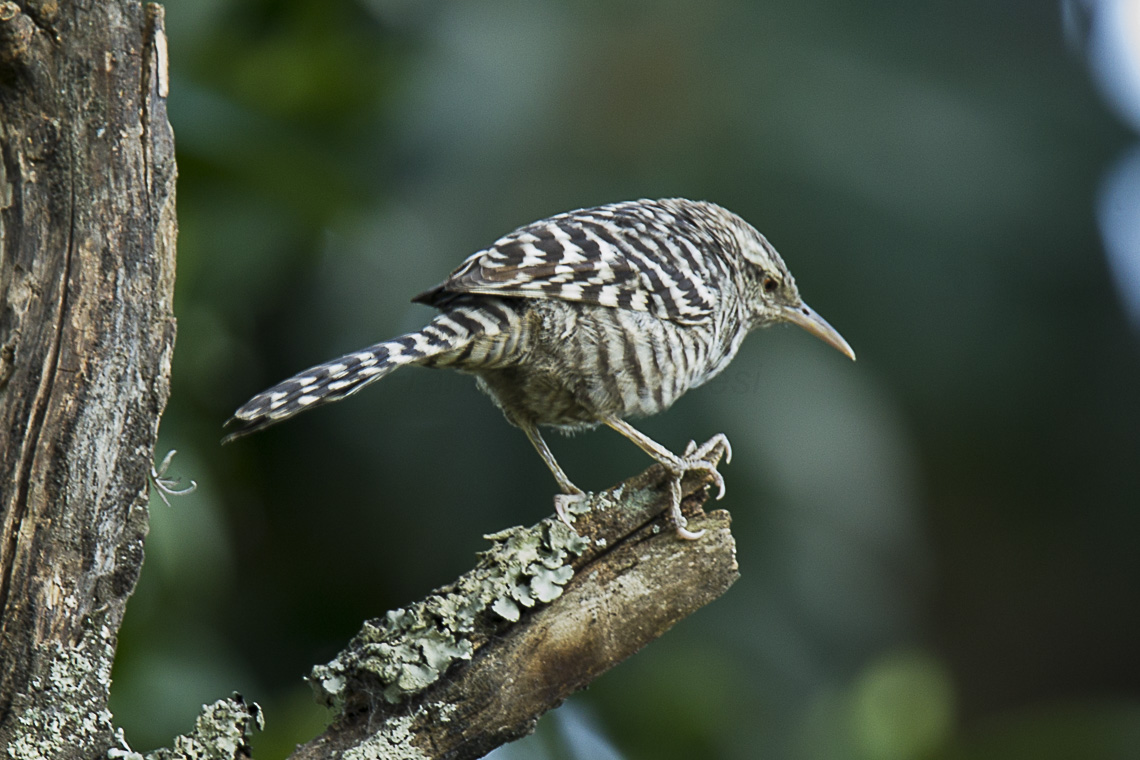

Conservation status
- Least Concern (IUCN 3.1)

Scientific classification
- Kingdom: Animalia
- Phylum: Chordata
- Class: Aves
- Order: Passeriformes
- Family: Troglodytidae
- Genus: Campylorhynchus
- Species: C. fasciatus

Binomial name
- Campylorhynchus fasciatus (Swainson, 1838)

= Fasciated wren =

Species of bird native to South America

The fasciated wren (Campylorhynchus fasciatus) is a species of bird in the family Troglodytidae. It is found in Ecuador and Peru.

== Taxonomy and systematics ==
The fasciated wren has two subspecies, the nominate Campylorhynchus fasciatus fasciatus and C. f. pallescens.

== Description ==
The fasciated wren is approximately 19 cm (7.5 in) long; one female weighed 24.9 g (0.88 oz). Both sexes of the nominate have a gray crown, grayish supercilium, and dark gray shoulders, back, and rump. The shoulders have whitish speckles and the rump whitish bars. The tail is barred off-white and blackish brown. The chin is off-white with darker streaks. The whitish chest and belly have heavy dark gray spots and the flanks are barred with dark gray. C. f. pallescens is paler with less distinct markings on the underside. The juvenile also has less well defined markings on its underside.

== Distribution and habitat ==
The nominate fasciated wren is found in coastal Peru from the Department of Piura south to the Department of Lima and also inland Peru from the departments of Cajamarca and Amazonas south to the Department of Huánuco. C. f. pallescens is found from southwestern and southern Ecuador into Peru's departments of Tumbes and Piura.

The fasciated wren primarily inhabits arid and semi-arid landscapes such as thorny scrublands. It also occurs in citrus orchards and other areas that humans have heavily modified. In Ecuador it uses more humid habitat including deciduous forest. In elevation the species is usually found between sea level and 1,500 m (4,920 ft) but can be found as high as 2,500 m (8,200 ft).

== Behavior ==
=== Feeding ===
The fasciated wren's diet is principally invertebrates but also includes some vegetable matter. It forages in groups, mostly in bushes and shrubs but sometimes on the ground.

=== Breeding ===
The fasciated wren's breeding season extends from May to August in most areas, but active nests have been noted in February and March in Ecuador. The species is a cooperative breeder, with groups of up to 10 individuals including a dominant pair. Its nest is a dome with a side entrance, constructed of grass and lined with feathers. It is sited in several species of trees and cactus. It also frequently uses an old mud nest of the pale-legged hornero (Furnarius leucopus).

=== Vocalization ===
The fasciated wren is a duet or group singer. Its song is "a series of harsh churring notes interspersed with gurgling notes"

. Its call is "a harsh 'churr'"

.

== Status ==
The IUCN has assessed the fasciated wren as being of Least Concern. It "[s]eems to adapt well to highly modified habitat, provided that sufficient bushes are left."
