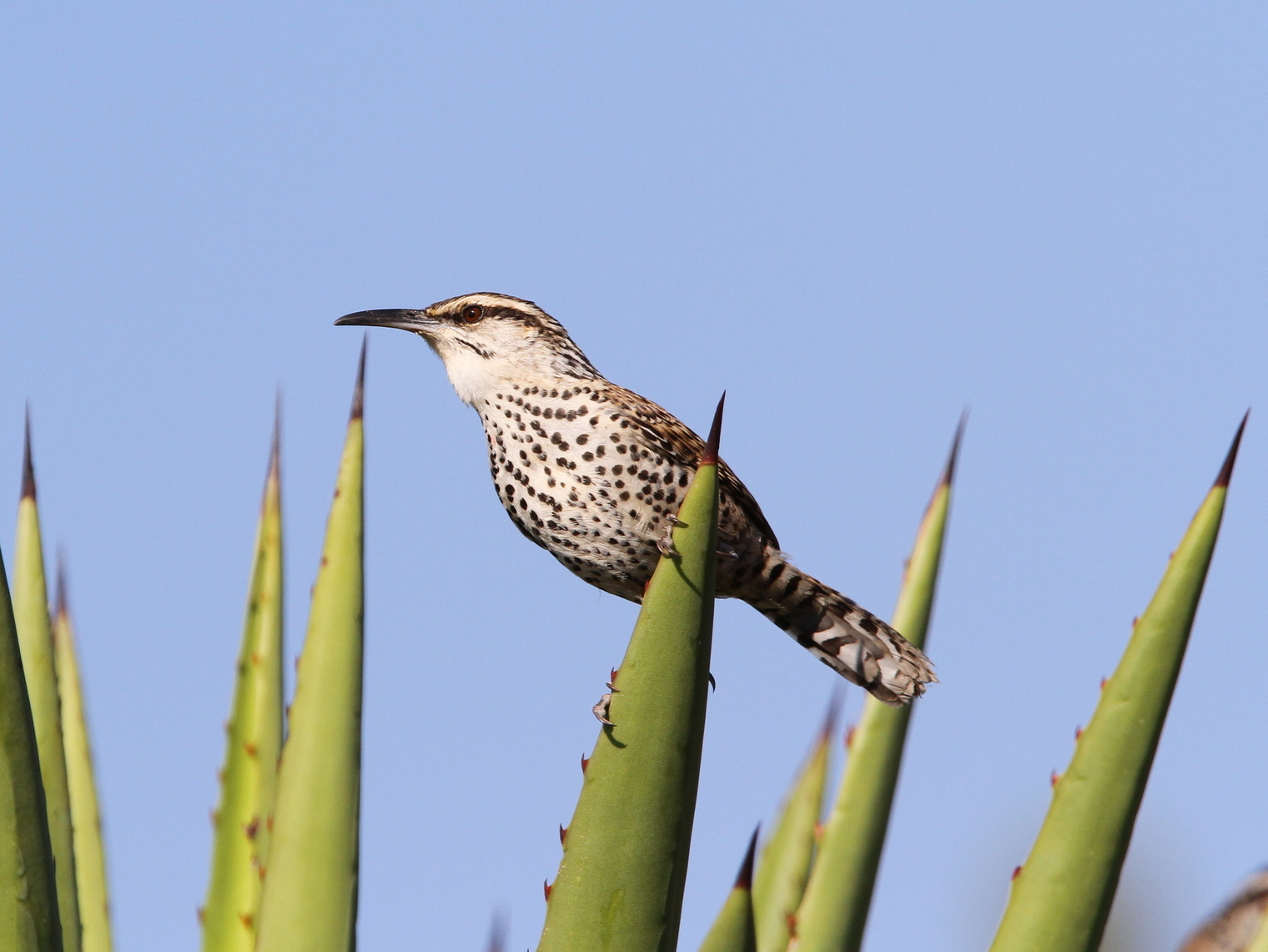

Conservation status
- Least Concern (IUCN 3.1)

Scientific classification
- Kingdom: Animalia
- Phylum: Chordata
- Class: Aves
- Order: Passeriformes
- Family: Troglodytidae
- Genus: Campylorhynchus
- Species: C. jocosus

Binomial name
- Campylorhynchus jocosus Sclater, PL, 1860

= Boucard's wren =

Species of bird endemic to Mexico

Boucard's wren (Campylorhynchus jocosus) is a species of bird in the family Troglodytidae. It is endemic to Mexico.

== Taxonomy and systematics ==
Boucard's wren has sometimes been considered conspecific with the spotted wren (Campylorhynchus gularis) but molecular data show that they are not closely related. The species is monotypic.

== Description ==
Boucard's wren is 17 cm (6.7 in) long and weighs 23.8 to 29.8 g (0.84 to 1.05 oz). The male has a chocolate crown, reddish nape, blackish shoulders with white streaks, a reddish-brown back with black and white spots, and a dull reddish rump. Its tail is gray-brown with dark brown bars and the outermost feathers have white tips. It has a dull white supercilium and blackish eyestripe; the rest of the face is dark gray. Its chin and throat are unmarked white and the underparts are white with black spots. Its flanks are buffy with darker bars. The female is similar but for smaller spots on the underparts. The markings on the juvenile's back are less well defined than the adult's, its throat is speckled, and its underparts are grayish with dull, diffuse, spots.

== Distribution and habitat ==
Boucard's wren is found in south-central Mexico, in the states of Puebla, Morelos, Guerrero, and Oaxaca. It inhabits dry to arid forest that sometimes has giant cacti; examples are pine–oak woodland, oak scrub, and subtropical scrub. It is very tolerant of habitat disturbance. In elevation it mostly ranges from 800 to 2,500 m (2,600 to 8,200 ft) but can be found as low as 600 m (2,000 ft).

== Behavior ==
=== Feeding ===
Boucard's wren forages from ground level to the tops of trees and cacti but seldom on the ground itself. Its diet includes both animal and vegetable matter such as insects and cactus seeds.

=== Breeding ===
Boucard's wren was observed building a nest in April, and nests with eggs were found in Oaxaca between mid-June and early July. The nests are domes with a side entrance. The clutch sizes were three to four.

=== Vocalization ===
The Boucard's wren song is "a series of grating notes" . It also produces "a harsh rapid chatter" . The sexes sing in unison.

== Status ==
The IUCN has assessed Boucard's wren as being of Least Concern. Its population is estimated to be at least 20,000 individuals and is believed to be stable.
