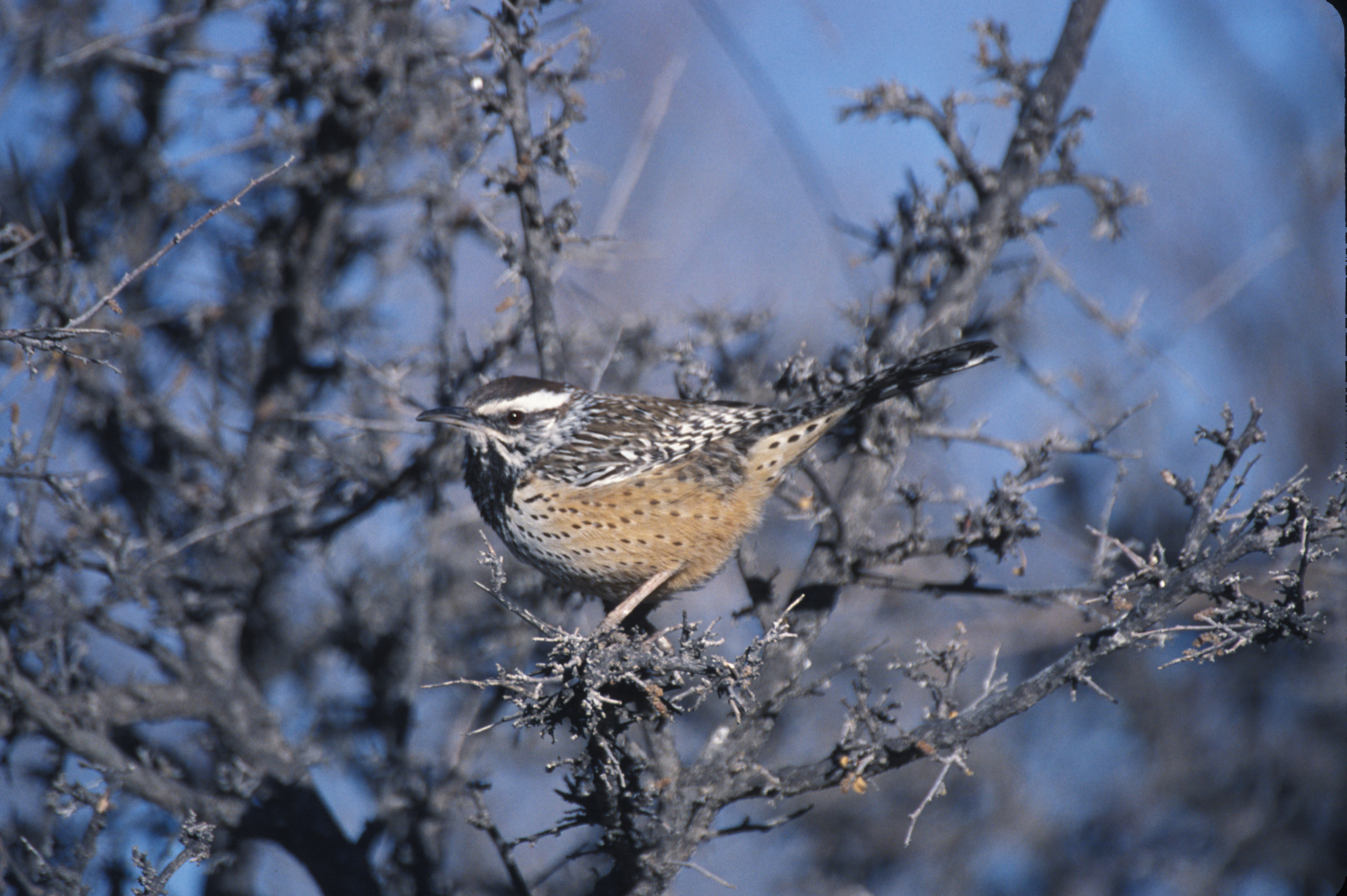
- Cactus wren (Campylorhynchus brunneicapillus)

Scientific classification
- Kingdom: Animalia
- Phylum: Chordata
- Class: Aves
- Order: Passeriformes
- Family: Troglodytidae
- Genus: Campylorhynchus; Spix, 1824

Type species
- Opetiorhynchus turdinus Wied-Neuwied, M, 1821

= Campylorhynchus =

Genus of birds

Campylorhynchus is a genus of wrens, which has at least 15 described species. At 17–22 cm (6.8-8.7 in) long, these are the largest-bodied of wrens, including the largest species, the giant wren. Member species are found in South and Central America and in the case of the cactus wren, as far north as the southwestern United States.

== Taxonymy ==
The genus Campylorhynchus was introduced in 1824 by the German naturalist Johann Baptist von Spix. He listed two species in his new genus but did not specify the type. The type was subsequently designated in 1840 by the English zoologist George Gray as Opetiorhynchos turdinus Wied-Neuwied, M, the thrush-like wren. The genus name combines the Ancient Greek καμπυλος/kampulos meaning "curved" or "bent" with ῥυγχος/rhunkhos meaning "bill". The genus now contains 15 species.

A 2007 genetic study established the following relationships between species, including some selected subspecies:

- Campylorhynchus
  - - - - - - - Campylorhynchus rufinucha s.s. humilis
              - Campylorhynchus rufinucha s.s. capistratus
            - Campylorhynchus gularis
          - Campylorhynchus jocosus
        - - Campylorhynchus griseus
          - Campylorhynchus chiapensis
      - Campylorhynchus yucatanicus
    - - Campylorhynchus brunneicapillus s.s. guttatus
      - Campylorhynchus brunneicapillus s.s. anthonyi
  - - - Campylorhynchus turdinus s.s. unicolor
      - Campylorhynchus turdinus s.s. hypostictus
    - - Campylorhynchus nuchalis
      - - - Campylorhynchus zonatus s.s. zonatus
          - Campylorhynchus megalopterus
        - - Campylorhynchus zonatus s.s. vulcanius
          - - Campylorhynchus fasciatus
            - - Campylorhynchus albobrunneus
              - Campylorhynchus albobrunneus s.s. aenigmaticus

== Species ==
Common name	Scientific name (Note: A binomial authority in parentheses indicates that the species was originally described in a genus other than Campylorhynchus.)	IUCN Red List Status	Distribution	Picture
Band-backed wren	Campylorhynchus zonatus (Lesson, 1832)	LC^{IUCN}		
Bicolored wren	Campylorhynchus griseus (Swainson, 1837)	LC^{IUCN}		
Boucard's wren	Campylorhynchus jocosus PL Sclater, 1859	LC^{IUCN}		
Cactus wren	Campylorhynchus brunneicapillus Lafresnaye, 1835	LC^{IUCN}		
Fasciated wren	Campylorhynchus fasciatus (Swainson, 1837)	LC^{IUCN}		
Giant wren	Campylorhynchus chiapensis Salvin & Godman, 1891	LC^{IUCN}		
Grey-barred wren	Campylorhynchus megalopterus Lafresnaye, 1845	LC^{IUCN}		
Veracruz wren	Campylorhynchus rufinucha (Lesson, 1838)	LC^{IUCN}		
Russet-naped wren	Campylorhynchus humilis PL Sclater, 1857	LC^{IUCN}		
Rufous-backed wren	Campylorhynchus capistratus (Lesson, 1842)	LC^{IUCN}		
Spotted wren	Campylorhynchus gularis Sclater, 1861	LC^{IUCN}		
Stripe-backed wren	Campylorhynchus nuchalis Cabanis, 1847	LC^{IUCN}		
Thrush-like wren	Campylorhynchus turdinus (Wied, 1821)	LC^{IUCN}		
White-headed wren	Campylorhynchus albobrunneus (Lawrence, 1862)	LC^{IUCN}		
Yucatan wren	Campylorhynchus yucatanicus (Hellmayr, 1934)	NT^{IUCN}		
