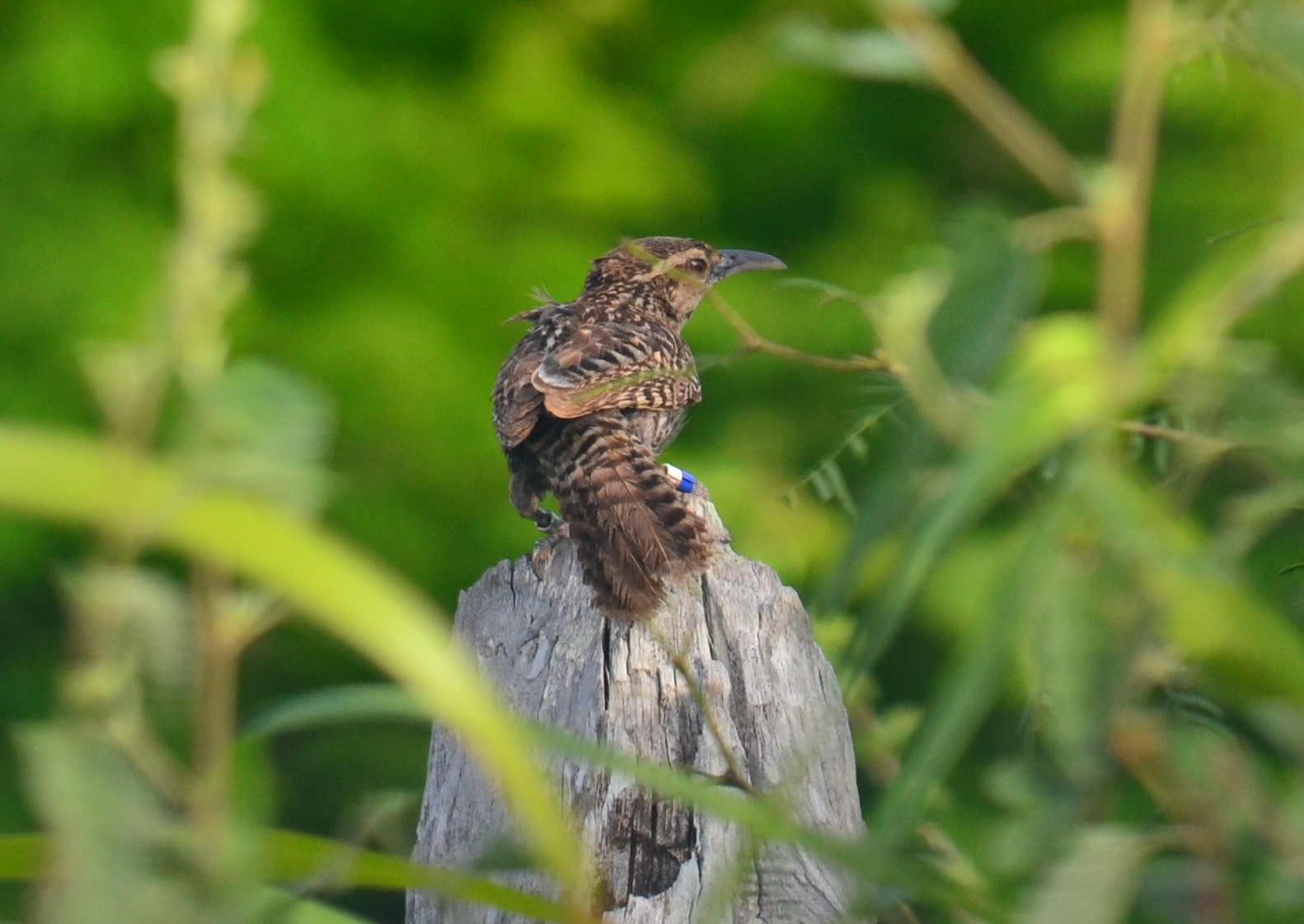

Conservation status
- Near Threatened (IUCN 3.1)

Scientific classification
- Kingdom: Animalia
- Phylum: Chordata
- Class: Aves
- Order: Passeriformes
- Family: Troglodytidae
- Genus: Campylorhynchus
- Species: C. yucatanicus

Binomial name
- Campylorhynchus yucatanicus (Hellmayr, 1934)

Synonyms
- Heleodytes brunneicapillus yucatanicus

= Yucatan wren =

Species of bird endemic to Mexico

The Yucatan wren (Campylorhynchus yucatanicus) is a species of bird in the family Troglodytidae. It is endemic to Mexico. Its natural habitat is subtropical or tropical dry shrubland, only found on the narrow coastal strip of the northern Yucatán Peninsula. One of the critical habitats of this species is the Petenes mangroves ecoregion of the Yucatan coast. It is threatened by habitat destruction.

== Description ==
The adult Yucatan wren is a small species about 18 centimetres (7 in) long. The face is whitish with a dark eye-stripe, and the crown is greyish brown. The upper parts are brown streaked with black and white, and the wings are brown and barred with dark brown and white. The tail is black barred with grey, with white tips to some of the outer feathers. The underparts are whitish with a dark cheek stripe and blackish spotting and barring. The juvenile is similar in appearance to the adult but with less contrast between the upper and underparts.

== Distribution and habitat ==
The Yucatan wren is endemic to a coastal strip of the Yucatan peninsula. It can be found in arid areas with scrub, large cacti, and pastureland edges. Its breeding range is even more restricted to a strip about one kilometre wide, edging the mangrove forests which fringe the coast.

== Ecology ==
The Yucatan wren is usually seen in pairs or small family groups and forages among the foliage and on the ground. Its diet is unknown.

The Yucatan wren starts nest-building activities in April, but eggs are laid in June. The nests are globular grass structures with side entrances. They are built a few metres off the ground in coastal scrub and the borders of the black mangrove (Avicennia germinans) forest, which thrives along the region's coasts. Clutch size averages three eggs, and both parents help rear the chicks. A third adult has been observed feeding the chicks occasionally, an example of cooperative breeding.

== Status ==
The population of the Yucatan wren is believed to be stable, but its range is small, and the bird is threatened by habitat loss as the area in which it lives is developed for tourism. For these reasons, the International Union for Conservation of Nature has assessed its conservation status as a "near-threatened species". In 2010, SEMARNAT and Norma Oficial Mexicana classified the Yucatan wren as endangered.
