= Balsas Depression =

Lowland region in southern Mexico

The Balsas Depression or Balsas River Basin is a wide region of lowlands located between the Trans-Mexican Volcanic Belt and the Sierra Madre del Sur. The depression spreads over large portions of the states of Jalisco, Michoacán, State of Mexico, Guerrero, Morelos, Tlaxcala, Oaxaca, and Puebla. Its lowest altitude varies between 300 and 600 meters above sea level.

== Location ==
The Balsas Depression comprises six percent of the total continental area of Mexico and includes various Central-West and South-Central economic regions of the country, between 17° and 20° N and 97°30′ and 103°15′ W. Morelos is completely situated within the depression, with large portions of Puebla, State of Mexico, Guerrero, and Michoacán also covered by the landform.

== Physical geography ==
The Balsas Depression is bounded by the Trans-Mexican Volcanic Belt to the north and the Sierra Madre del Sur to the south, with the Sierra Norte de Oaxaca to the east.

The origin and evolution of these morphological structures produced a large variety of physiographic, geologic, topographic, and climatic characteristics that are now part of the Balsas River Basin.

The Trans-Mexican Volcanic Belt, made up primarily of limestones, schists, and sandstones from the early Cretaceous, was subject to tectonic uplift from folding and fractures. These allowed the escape of igneous materials that, at the end of the Mesozoic and the beginning of the Cenozoic, covered a wide band and greatly affected the topography. Because of its orographic continuity, high mountain passes, and uninterrupted divides, this large physiographic formation became a climatic and biogeographic barrier for the flora and fauna of Mexico.

== Vegetation ==
According to the classification of Jerzy Rzedowski, the Balsas Depression, particularly along the flanks of the Sierra Madre del Sur, is one of the world's richest regions in flora and has a high level of endemism, including the genera Mitrocereus, Hymenostephium, and Lopezia. It has the greatest concentration of species of the genus Bursera in Mexico. About 70 species of this American genus have been identified, 51 of them in Mexico; of these, some 34 live in various parts of the Balsas basin, and 21 are exclusive to it.

The steep slopes along the northern edges of the depression have a sequence of altitudinal vegetation zones. From the top they run from species of volcanic tundra (5,000–4,000 m above sea level), to pine and oyamel fir forests (4,000–3,000 m), and to oak forests with madrone trees and mesophilic forests (3,000–1,800 m).

The hills, gullies, and plains of the depression are covered by oak, palm, and cuajilote forests from 1,800 to 800 m above sea level. Spiny shrubs, cacti, and cochal make up the vegetation of the arid hills between 200 and 1,500 m above sea level.

The vegetation cover of the Balsas River delta is secondary, with remnants of older primary plant communities. Human activities, especially industrial port development, livestock farming, and fruit cultivation, have altered the structure, physiognomy, and floristic composition of the primary vegetation so much that it is hard to recognize.

Remnants of medium-height and low-height semi-deciduous forest remain in the east. Secondary grasslands and scrublands dominate, alternating with species typical of low-canopy forest, such as Amphipterygium adstringens, Heliocarpus, Cochlospermum, Leucaena, Gliricidia sepium, Guazuma ulmifolia, and Bursera simaruba.

To the west, the delta extends toward the Lázaro Cárdenas plain, an area of about 165 km² of rolling hills, ridges, and flatlands. Its sandy coastal flats include flood-prone areas and estuaries. The El Manglito estuary lies at the beginning of the plain. Other estuaries lie farther northwest, most notably El Caimán (or Santa Ana), El Piche, and Playa Azul. The line of beaches, estuaries, and river and stream mouths continues to the Las Peñas region, where the plain ends.

== See also ==
- Geography of Mexico
- Isthmus of Tehuantepec
- Balsas River
