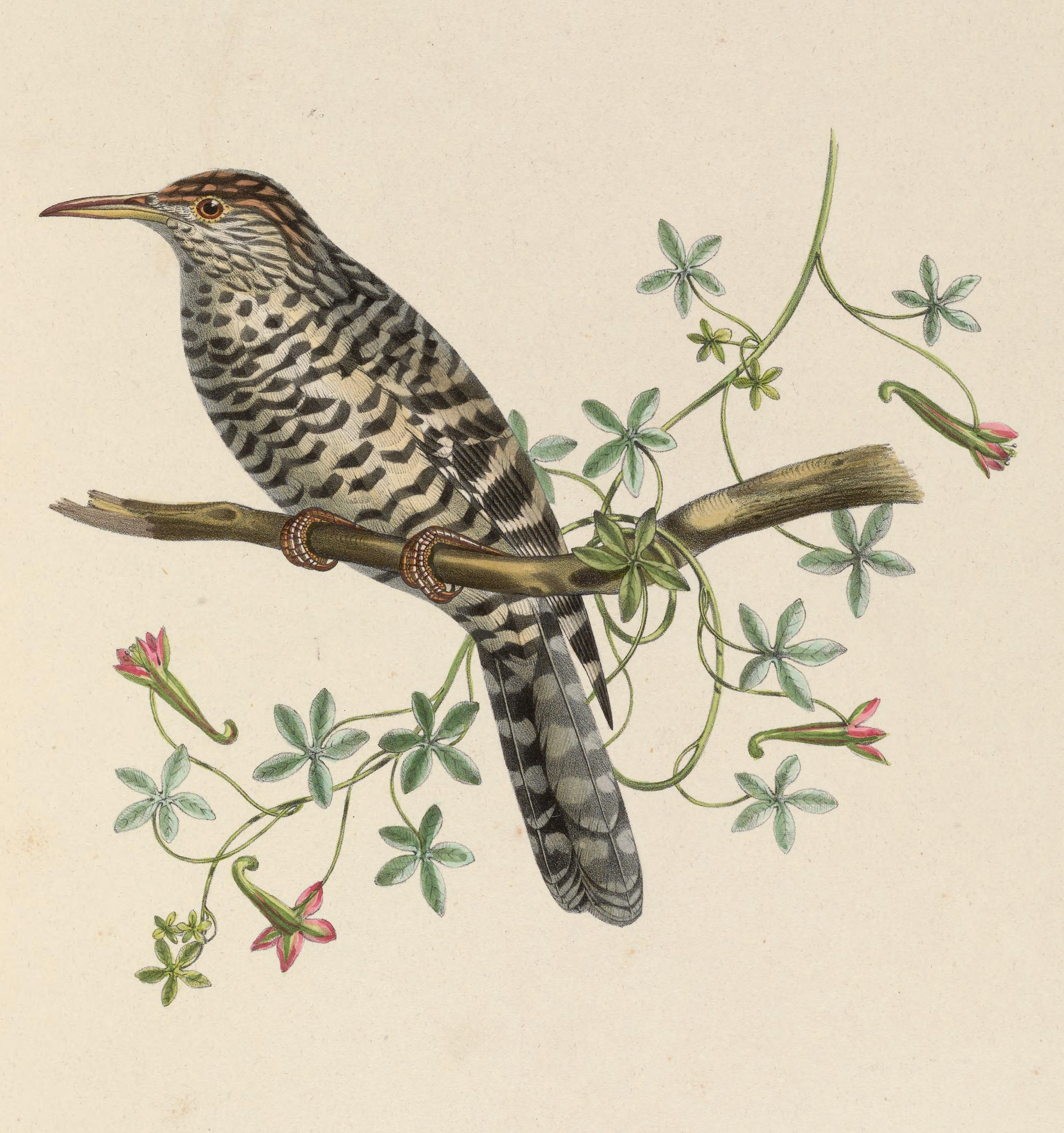

Conservation status
- Least Concern (IUCN 3.1)

Scientific classification
- Kingdom: Animalia
- Phylum: Chordata
- Class: Aves
- Order: Passeriformes
- Family: Troglodytidae
- Genus: Campylorhynchus
- Species: C. megalopterus

Binomial name
- Campylorhynchus megalopterus Lafresnaye, 1845

= Gray-barred wren =

Species of bird endemic to Mexico

The gray-barred wren (Campylorhynchus megalopterus) is a species of bird in the family Troglodytidae. It is endemic to Mexico.

== Taxonomy and systematics ==
The gray-barred wren has two subspecies, the nominate Campylorhynchus megalopterus megalopterus and C. m. nelsoni. The latter has been suggested as a separate species but there are only small differences between the subspecies in size and plumage and no apparent differences in their voices.

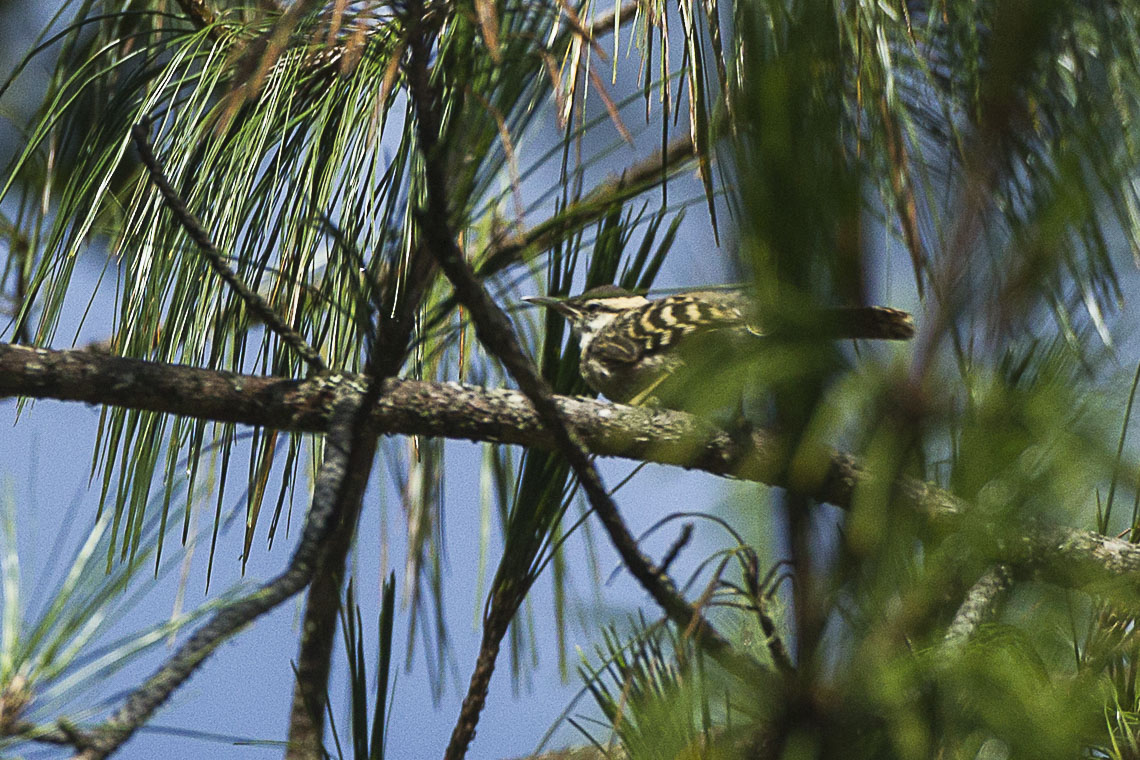
C. m. nelsoni

== Description ==
The gray-barred wren is 17 to 19.5 cm (6.7 to 7.7 in) long and weighs 32.8 to 33.5 g (1.16 to 1.18 oz). Both sexes of the nominate have a grayish crown with a black center, a black and white striped nape, and black shoulders and back barred with white. Their throat and chest are white with black spots and the flanks buff with blackish bars. C. m. nelsoni is the smaller of the subspecies and its underparts' spots and bars are grayish brown. The juvenile has a solid brown cap and is buff and brownish overall with no bars on the back and no spots on the chest.

== Distribution and habitat ==
The ranges of the two subspecies of gray-barred wren do not meet. The nominate is found in the Trans-Mexican Volcanic Belt from Jalisco and Michoacán east to western Puebla. C. m. nelsoni is found in the southern Sierra Madre Oriental from west-central Veracruz through eastern Puebla into northern Oaxaca. It inhabits several types of montane forest including humid pine-oak and stands of Abies fir. It occurs in both primary and secondary forest. In elevation it ranges between 2,100 and 3,150 m (6,890 and 10,330 ft).

== Behavior ==
=== Feeding ===
Though the gray-barred wren's diet has not been documented, it is probably small invertebrates. It does not forage on the ground but probes epiphytes, mosses, and lichens.

=== Breeding ===
The gray-barred wren's breeding season appears to be May to June. Its nest is a domed structure with a side entrance constructed of moss and placed high in a tree. Little else is known about the species' breeding phenology.

=== Vocalization ===
The gray-barred wren's song is "a rapid harsh chatter"; both sexes sing in duet. Its call is "a harsh 'karrr'".

== Status ==
The IUCN has assessed the gray-barred wren as being of Least Concern. It is "common in many areas of suitable habitat" and "[appears] able to tolerate some modification of habitat."
