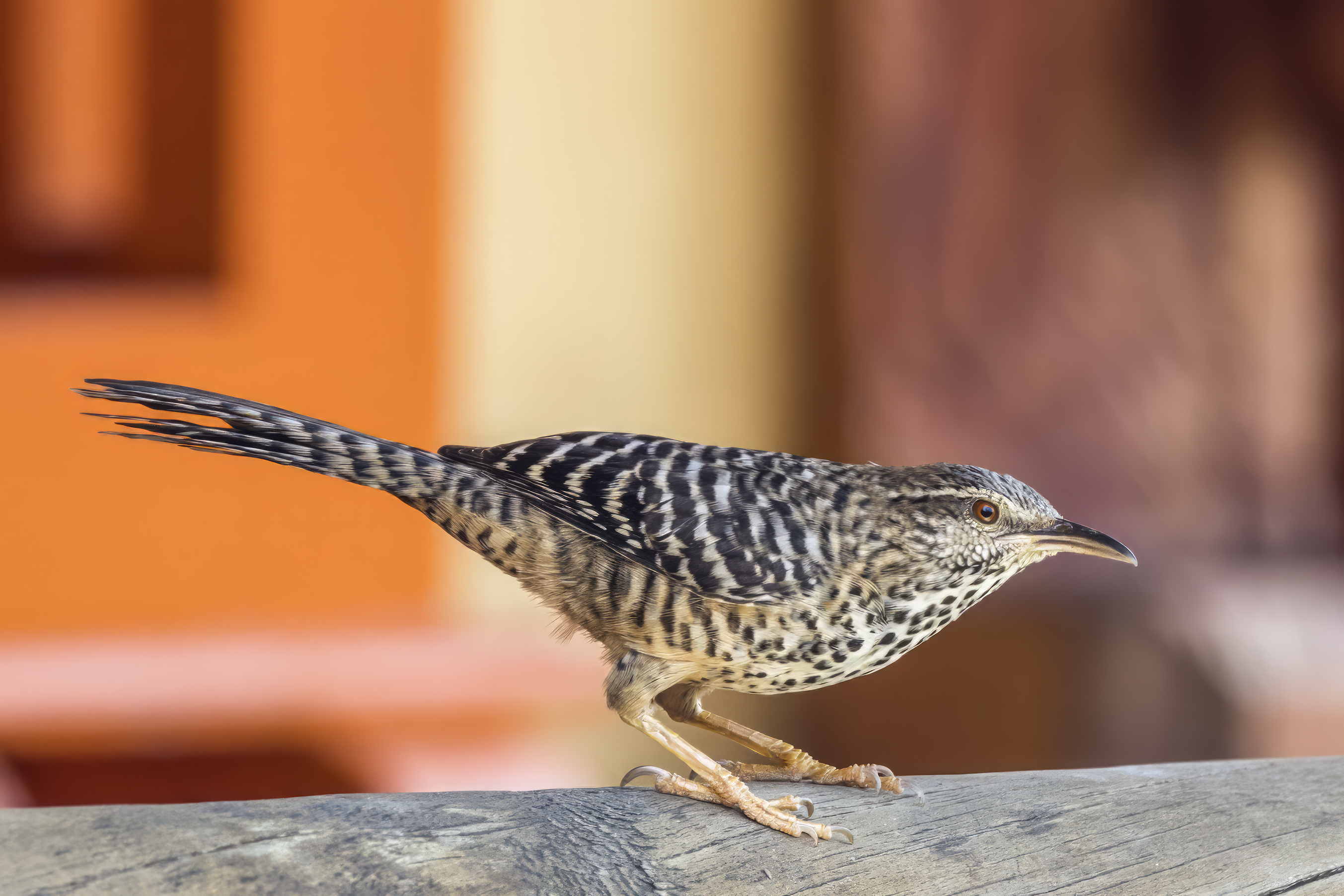

Conservation status
- Least Concern (IUCN 3.1)

Scientific classification
- Kingdom: Animalia
- Phylum: Chordata
- Class: Aves
- Order: Passeriformes
- Family: Troglodytidae
- Genus: Campylorhynchus
- Species: C. zonatus

Binomial name
- Campylorhynchus zonatus (Lesson, 1832)

= Band-backed wren =

Species of bird native to South and Central America

The band-backed wren (Campylorhynchus zonatus) is a small songbird of the wren family.

The band-backed wren is a resident breeding species from south-central Gulf Coast Mexico to northwestern Ecuador. It occurs in five disjunct areas, the central region being in southern Central America, in Costa Rica and northern Panama. The next two regions are northern Colombia adjacent to Panama, and 800 km to the south in northwestern Ecuador.

== Description ==
This large wren breeds in lowlands and foothills from sea level up to 1700 m altitude in thinned forest or open woodland, scrub, second growth and groves around houses. It mainly occurs on the Caribbean side of the Central American mountain ranges. Its large spherical nest has a wide side entrance and is constructed 2 – 30 m high in a tree or shrub, often hidden amidst bromeliads. The female alone incubates the three to five unmarked or lightly brown-spotted white eggs for about two weeks to hatching, and the young fledge in about the same length of time again. After breeding, families sleep together in dormitory nests like those used for breeding throughout the year.

The adult band-backed wren is 16.5 cm long and weighs 29 g. It has a brown-grey crown, black nape, and the rest of the upperparts and tail are heavily barred with black, tawny and white. The breast and throat are white, heavily spotted with black, and the belly is cinnamon. Young birds have duller upperparts and off-white to buff underparts.

This species has a short rasping zek call. The song is a mix of dry chatters, splutters and gurgles.

The band-backed wren forages actively in family groups of 4-12 birds. It eats mainly insects, spiders and other invertebrates.
