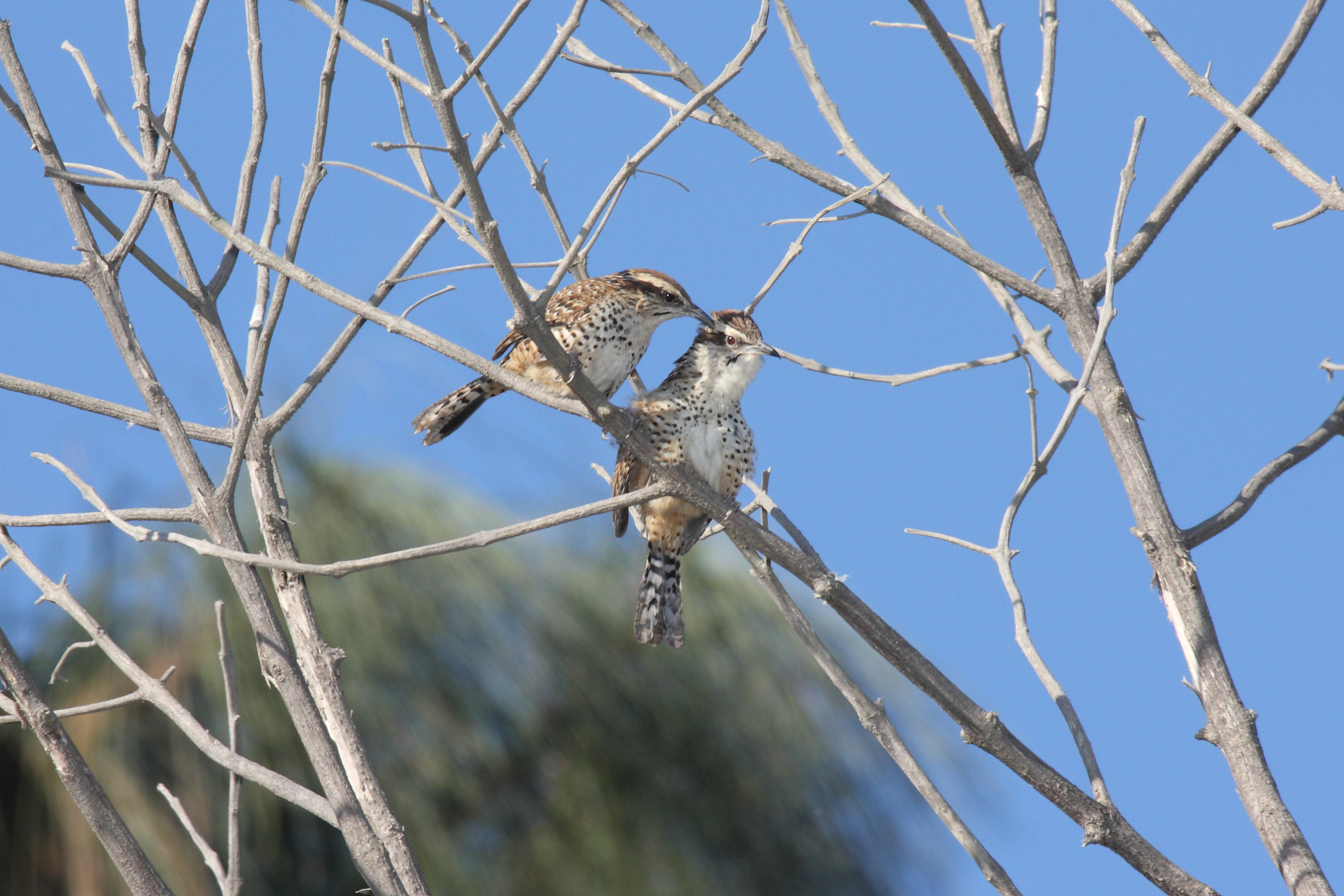

Conservation status
- Least Concern (IUCN 3.1)

Scientific classification
- Domain: Eukaryota
- Kingdom: Animalia
- Phylum: Chordata
- Class: Aves
- Order: Passeriformes
- Family: Troglodytidae
- Genus: Campylorhynchus
- Species: C. gularis

Binomial name
- Campylorhynchus gularis Sclater, PL, 1861

= Spotted wren =

Species of bird native to Mexico

The spotted wren (Campylorhynchus gularis) is a species of bird in the family Troglodytidae. It is endemic to Mexico.

== Taxonomy and systematics ==
The spotted wren has sometimes been considered conspecific with Boucard's wren (Campylorhynchus jocosus) but molecular data show that they are not closely related. The species is monotypic.

== Description ==
The spotted wren is 17 cm (6.7 in) long and weighs 28.3 to 31 g (1.00 to 1.09 oz). Adults of both sexes have a chestnut crown and rufescent brown shoulders and back with dull black and buffy markings. The tail is gray-brown with darker bars. They have a white supercilium and a brown eyestripe above buffy white cheeks. Their chin, throat, and chest are off-white and the sides of the chest have blackish spots. The belly and lower flanks are buffy with faint barring. The juvenile's crown is dull black, the markings on the back are fainter than the adults', and the chest is pale buff without the adults' spots.

== Distribution and habitat ==
The spotted wren is found in two areas of Mexico separated by unsuitable habitat. In the west it ranges from southeastern Sonora south to western México state and western Morelos. East of that band it ranges from southern Nuevo León, southwestern Tamaulipas, and central San Luis Potosí south to Hidalgo. It occurs in several habitat types, from dry oak and pine-oak woodlands to stands of shrubs and cactus to rocky slopes with palms. In elevation it is generally found between 800 and 2,500 m (2,600 and 8,200 ft) but ranges up to 3,000 m (9,800 ft) in Colima.

== Behavior ==
=== Feeding ===
The spotted wren actively forages in small groups, usually on or near the ground but as high as 15 m (49 ft). It probes bark crevices, epiphytes, and among rocks for invertebrates. It also eats vegetable matter like cactus seeds and has been seen to prey on small lizards.

=== Breeding ===
The spotted wren's breeding phenology is virtually unknown. It builds a domed nest with side entrance like others of its genus. The clutch size appears to be two to four.

=== Vocalization ===
The spotted wren's song has been described as "a series of harsh churring notes" and "a series of unmusical gurgling phrases" . Its call is "a gruff 'cheh-cheh-cheht'" .

== Status ==
The IUCN has assessed the spotted wren as being of Least Concern. "Abundance varies; quite sparse and uncommon in some areas, and very common in suitable habitat in others."
