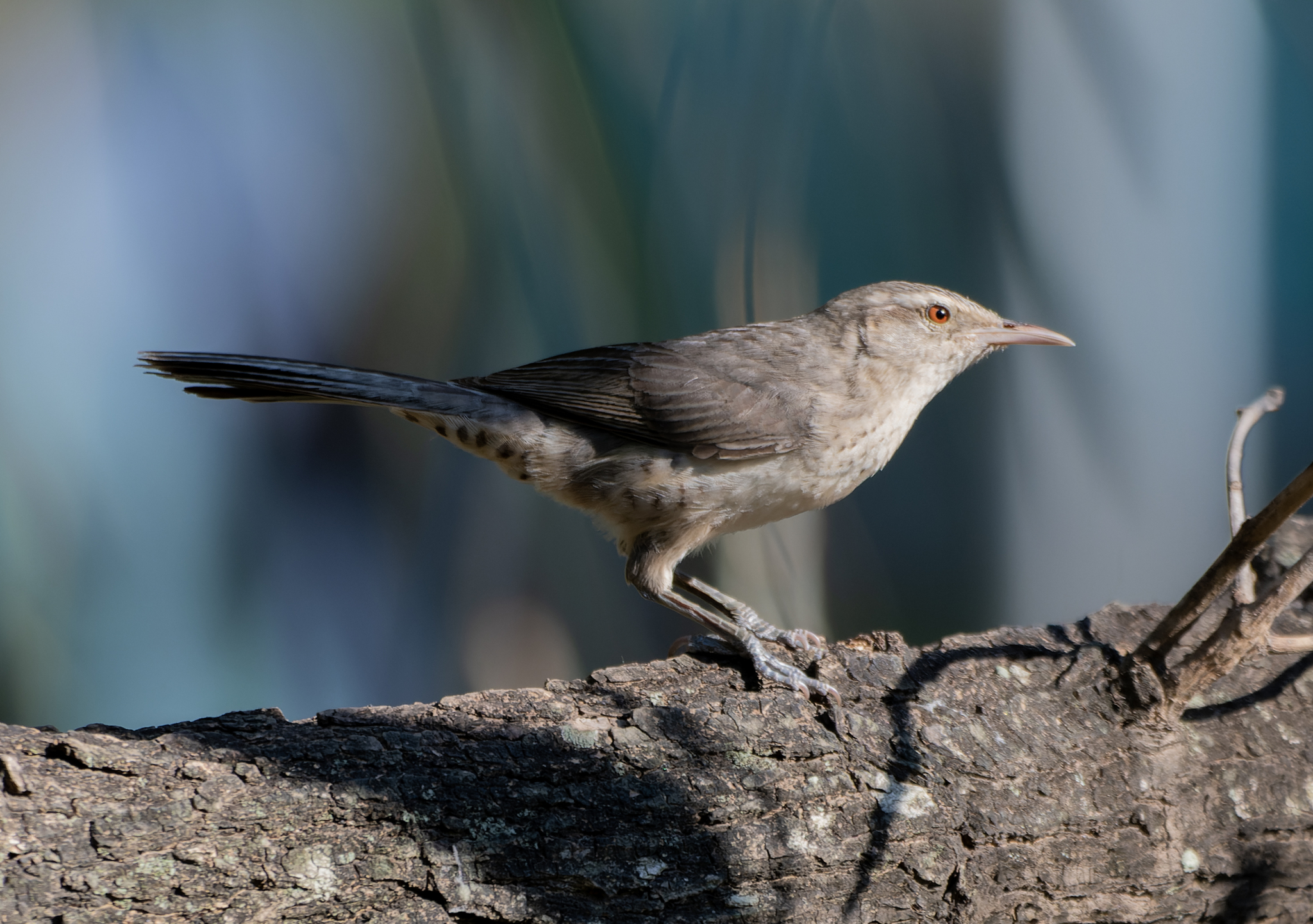

Conservation status
- Least Concern (IUCN 3.1)

Scientific classification
- Kingdom: Animalia
- Phylum: Chordata
- Class: Aves
- Order: Passeriformes
- Family: Troglodytidae
- Genus: Campylorhynchus
- Species: C. turdinus

Binomial name
- Campylorhynchus turdinus (Wied-Neuwied, M, 1821)

= Thrush-like wren =

Species of bird endemic to South America

The thrush-like wren (Campylorhynchus turdinus) is a South American species of bird in the family Troglodytidae, the wrens. As suggested by its common and scientific name, its size and coloration are vaguely reminiscent of that of a thrush, although the general impression it gives in life is very different and not at all "thrush-like".

With a total length of approximately 20 cm (8 in), it is among the largest species of wrens. The head and mantle are brownish-gray. The wings and upper tail are dull brown with dense blackish barring. The whitish underparts are heavily spotted with dusky, except on the throat. It typically shows a distinctive whitish eyebrow and the relatively long tail is commonly held cocked. The slightly decurved bill is relatively long, and, for a wren, thick. The irides are dull amber, maroon or brown.

Unlike most other wrens, it is typically found from mid-levels to canopy height. Despite its size, it is relatively inconspicuous, and usually revealed only by its loud, complex voice, which is highly characteristic. It feeds primarily on insects, but will also take vegetable matter and small invertebrates. Typically forages in pairs or small groups.

== Subspecies and distribution ==
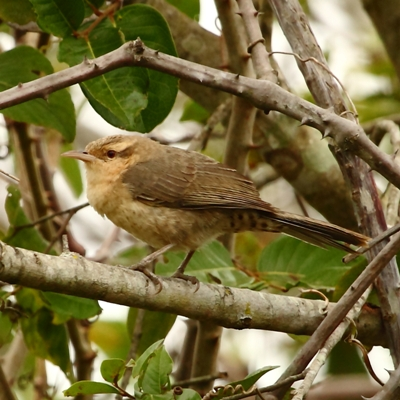
northern Pantanal, Brazil

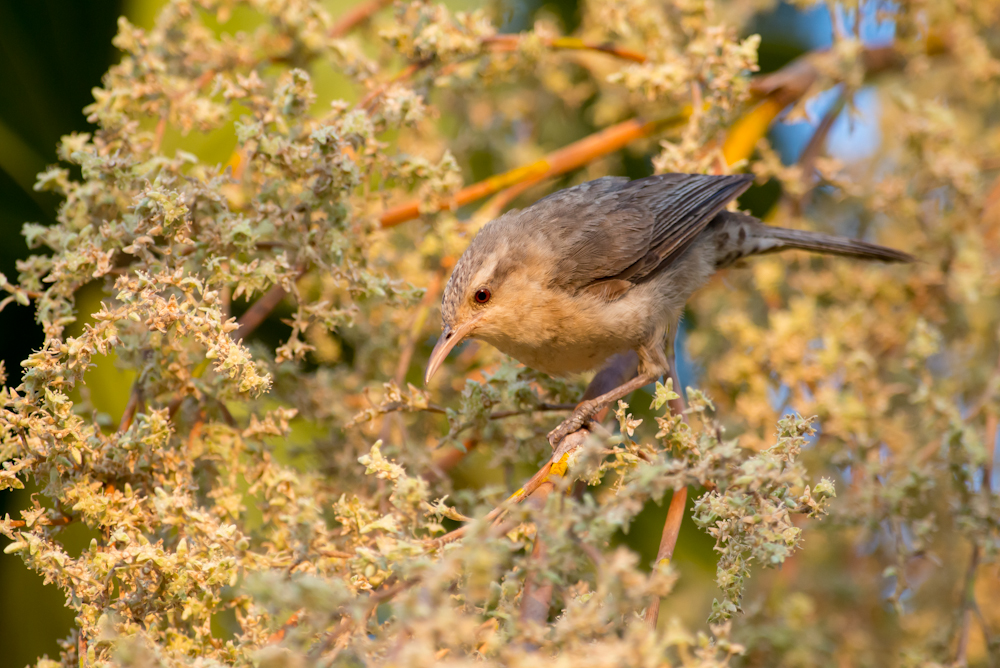
C. t. unicolor as above

The thrush-like wren inhabits three main regions; each with its own subspecies. C. turdinus hypostictus is found in the southern and western Amazon rainforest in south-eastern Colombia, eastern Ecuador, eastern Peru, northern Bolivia and Amazonian Brazil south of the Amazon River. The paler, greyer and much more uniform C. t. unicolor is found in the drier and more open wooded habitats in the Pantanal of Brazil, eastern Bolivia, Paraguay and far northern Argentina (where range is expanding). The nominate subspecies, C. t. turdinus, resembles C. t. hypostictus both in habitat preference and morphology, and is found in the narrow coastal belt of Atlantic moist forests in eastern Brazil from near Salvador da Bahia in north to Espírito Santo in south. It is relatively common in most of its range.
