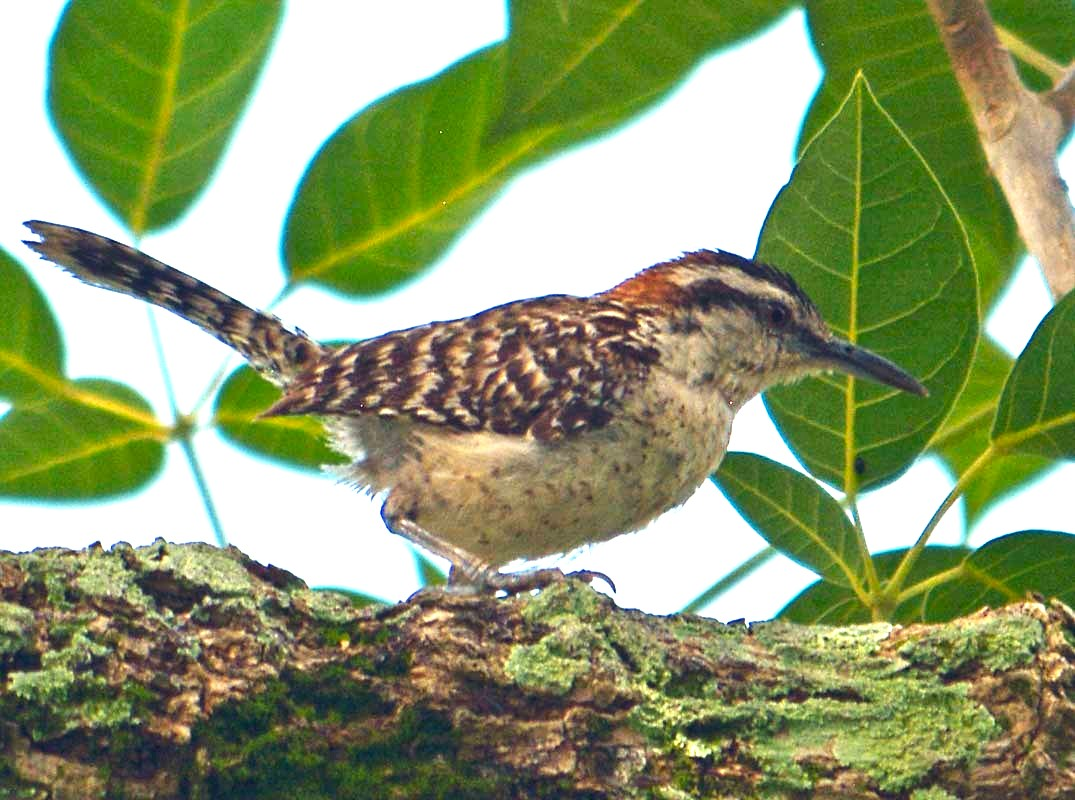

Conservation status
- Least Concern (IUCN 3.1)

Scientific classification
- Kingdom: Animalia
- Phylum: Chordata
- Class: Aves
- Order: Passeriformes
- Family: Troglodytidae
- Genus: Campylorhynchus
- Species: C. rufinucha

Binomial name
- Campylorhynchus rufinucha (Lesson, 1838)

= Veracruz wren =

Species of bird native to Mexico

The Veracruz wren (Campylorhynchus rufinucha) is a songbird of the family Troglodytidae. It is endemic to Mexico.

== Taxonomy and systematics ==
What is now the Veracruz wren was previously treated as one of eight subspecies of rufous-naped wren (that carried the binomial Campylorhynchus rufinucha). A 2009 publication proposed that Campylorhynchus rufinucha (sensu lato) be split into three species and the International Ornithological Committee (IOC) accepted the splits. Because the binomial C. rufinucha (sensu stricto) had scientific priority, it received the new English name Veracruz wren. What had been C. r. humilis was elevated to species status as Sclater's wren and the other six subspecies became subspecies of C. capistratus, the rufous-backed wren.

BirdLife International (BLI) has implemented the split but retains the English name rufous-naped wren for C. rufinucha. However, the North American Classification Committee of the American Ornithological Society (NACC/AOS) and the Clements taxonomy have not accepted the split as of early 2021.

== Description ==
The adult Veracruz wren has a blackish crown, lores, and eyestripe and a white supercilium. Its nape and back are chestnut and the shoulders have black and white streaks. Its tail is gray-brown with darker bars and a white tip. Its chin and throat are white, the chest pale buff with brown spots, and its belly a darker buff with faint blackish bars on the flanks. The juvenile is similar but its supercilium is buffy white, the back a duller cinnamon, and the markings on the back less distinct.

== Distribution and habitat ==
The Veracruz wren is found primarily in central Veracruz state and very slightly into north-central Oaxaca. It inhabits lowland dry tropical forest, primarily in arid and semi-arid areas. It also occurs in human-modified landscapes and coastal mangroves.

== Behavior ==
=== Feeding ===
The Veracruz wren preys on a variety of insects.

=== Breeding ===
Little information is available on the Veracruz wren's breeding phenology. It is known to build a globular nest with a side entrance like the other species in its genus.

=== Vocalization ===
An example of the Veracruz wren's song is . An example call is .

== Status ==
The IUCN has assessed the Veracruz wren as being of Least Concern. "The population has not been quantified since the species was split" but "is suspected to be stable in the absence of evidence for any declines or substantial threats."
