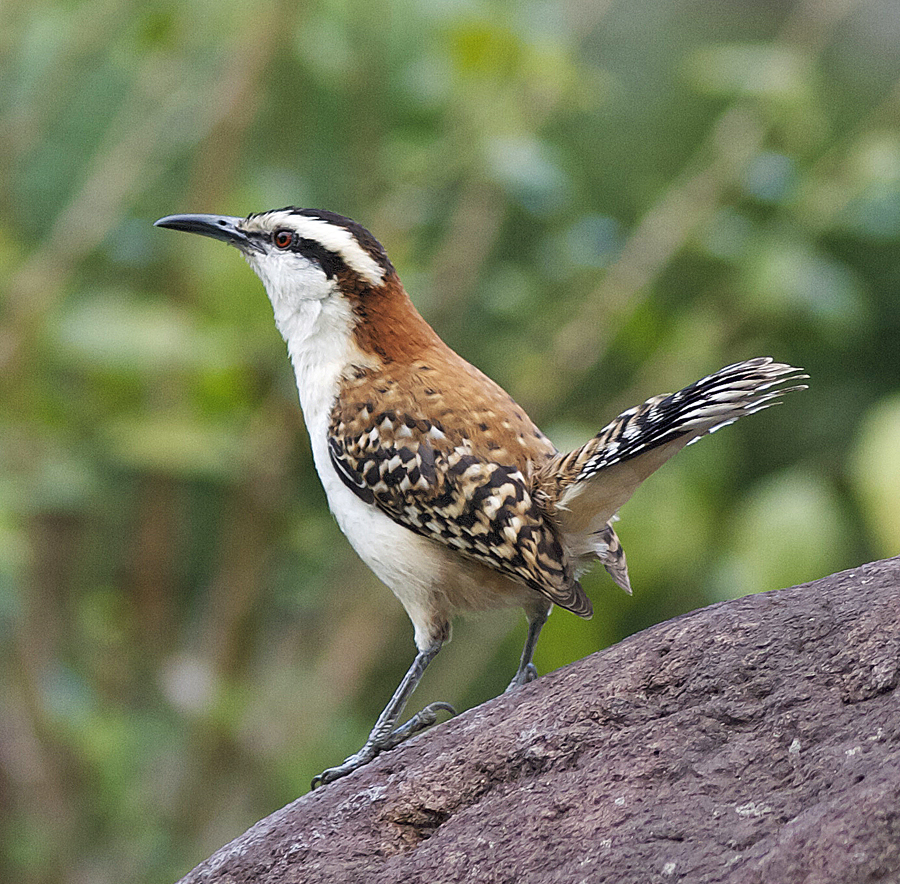
- in Santo Domingo, Costa Rica

Conservation status
- Least Concern (IUCN 3.1)

Scientific classification
- Kingdom: Animalia
- Phylum: Chordata
- Class: Aves
- Order: Passeriformes
- Family: Troglodytidae
- Genus: Campylorhynchus
- Species: C. capistratus

Binomial name
- Campylorhynchus capistratus (Lesson, 1842)

= Rufous-backed wren =

Species of bird

The rufous-backed wren (Campylorhynchus capistratus) is a species of songbird in the family Troglodytidae. It is a resident breeding species distributed from southwestern Mexico to northwestern Costa Rica.

== Taxonomy and systematics ==
What is now classified as the rufous-backed wren was formerly treated as six of the eight subspecies of rufous-naped wren (Campylorhynchus rufinucha). Following a 2009 proposal to split C. rufinucha (sensu lato) into three distinct species, the International Ornithological Committee (IOC) formally recognized the reclassification. Under this revision, C. r. humilis was elevated to full species status as Sclater's wren (Campylorhynchus humilis). The restricted C. rufinucha received the new English name Veracruz wren, and the remaining six subspecies were regrouped under rufous-backed wren.

While BirdLife International implemented the split, retaining the English name rufous-naped wren for C. rufinucha, major authorities such as the North American Classification Committee of the American Ornithological Society (NACC/AOS) and the Clements taxonomy had not accepted the revision as of early 2021.

The six subspecies of rufous-backed wren accepted by the IOC are:

- C. c. nigricaudatus Nelson (1897)
- C. c. capistratus Lesson (1842)
- C. c. xerophilus Griscom (1930)
- C. c. castaneus Ridgway (1888)
- C. c. nicaraguae Miller, W. & Griscom (1925)
- C. c. nicoyae Phillips (1986)

The subspecies C. c. nicoyae has not been accepted by the Clements taxonomy.

== Description ==
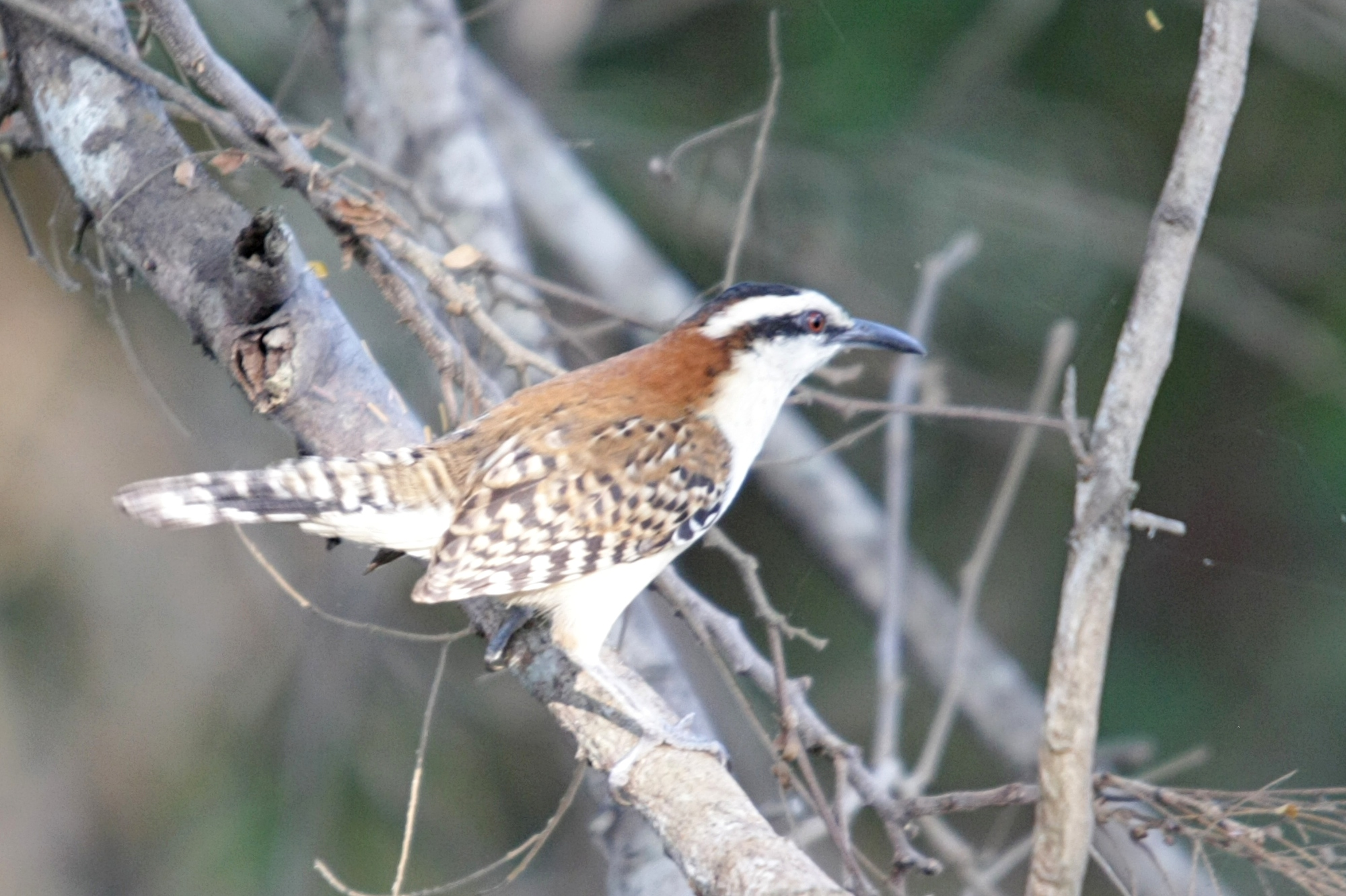
in Guanacaste province, Costa Rica

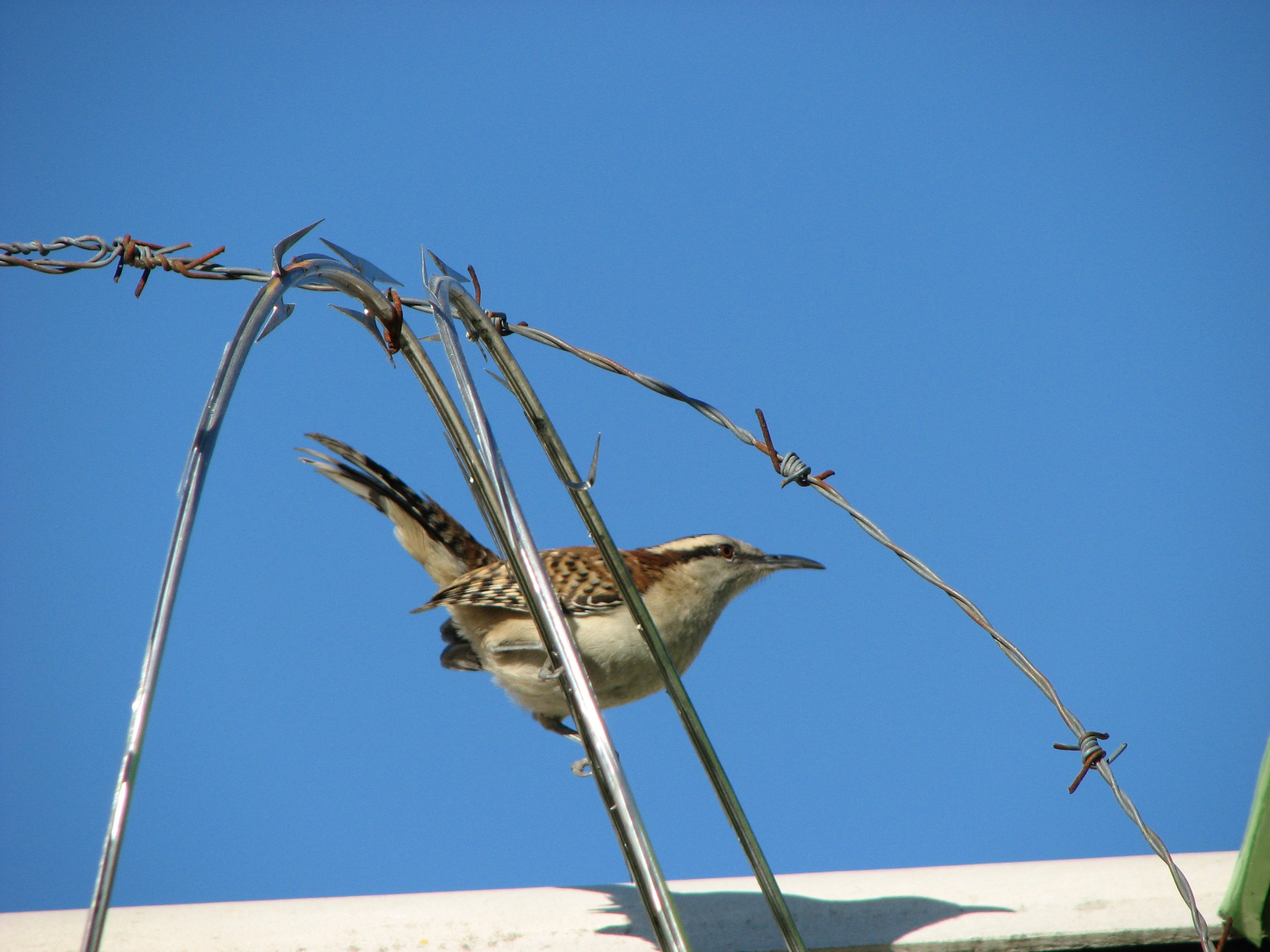
in El Salvador

The adult rufous-backed wren measure 17 cm (6.7 in) in length and weighs between 29 to 42 g (1.0 to 1.5 oz). While slight variation exists among the subspecies, adults generally possess a black crown and eyestripe separated by a white supercilium, a rufous nape, and cinnamon to chestnut upper parts streaked with black and white, most prominently on the rump. The wings and tail feature black and grayish-white barring, while the underparts are plain white. Juveniles are distinguished by duller upper parts and buff-colored underparts.

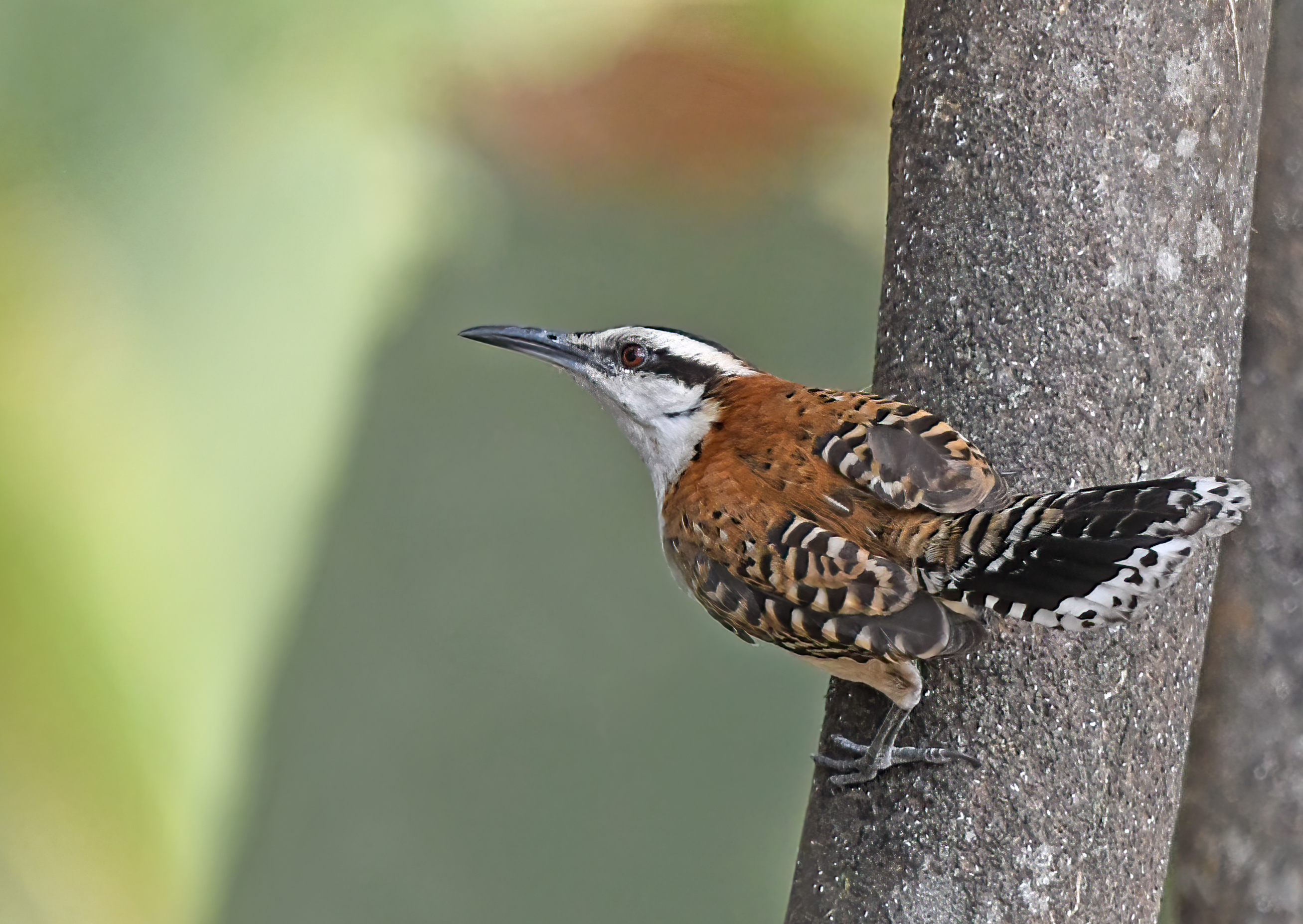
In San José, Costa Rica

== Distribution and habitat ==
The six subspecies of rufous-backed wren are found thus:

- C. c. nigricaudatus, the Pacific coastal plain from southwestern Chiapas, Mexico into Guatemala
- C. c. capistratus, the Pacific coastal plain from Guatemala south into El Salvador
- C. c. xerophilus, the Motagua Valley of Guatemala
- C. c. castaneus, interior Guatemala east to Honduras and Nicaragua
- C. c. nicaraguae, interior of western Nicaragua
- C. c. nicoyae, the Nicoya Peninsula of northwestern Costa Rica

This large wren occurs in lowlands and foothills from sea level up to 800 m (2,600 ft) elevation in Costa Rica and as high as 1,400 m (4,600 ft) in El Salvador. It inhabits dry forest or open woodland, scrub, second growth and savanna, mainly on the Pacific side of the central mountain ranges.

== Behavior ==
=== Feeding ===
The rufous-backed wren forages actively in low vegetation in pairs or family groups, searching primarily for insects and other invertebrates. The species has adapted well to human presence and occasionally consumes table scraps. When handling prey, individuals frequently thrash it with their beak prior to ingestion.

=== Breeding ===
The rufous-backed wren constructs a spherical nest lined with seed down, featuring a side entrance. Nests are positioned 1.5 to 8 m (4.9–26.2 ft) above ground in thorny trees or shrubs, particularly bull's-horn acacias. The species occasionally nests near active wasps nests, an association that evidence suggests provides significant protection against predators. Incubation is performed solely by the female, who sits in a clutch of three to five white or greenish eggs spotted with brown or black, for approximately two weeks until hatching. Outside the breeding season, family groups continue to roost together in dedicated dormitory nests of similar construction as those for breeding.

=== Vocalization ===
Rufous-backed wren song
Recorded in Honduras

Across its subspecies, the rufous-backed wren maintains a core song structure characterized by phrases of melodic, pure-tone syllables with multiple frequency shifts. Vocalization of an individual recorded in Costa Rica . A second example, recorded in Mexico . The species displays significant call variation within individual subspecies; examples include , , and .

== Status ==
The IUCN has assessed the rufous-backed wren as being of Least Concern. "The population has not been quantified since the species was split" but "is suspected to be stable in the absence of evidence for any declines or substantial threats."

== Other reading ==
- Stiles, F. Gary; Skutch, Alexander F. (1989). A Guide to the Birds of Costa Rica. Comstock Publishing Associates. ISBN 0-8014-9600-4.
