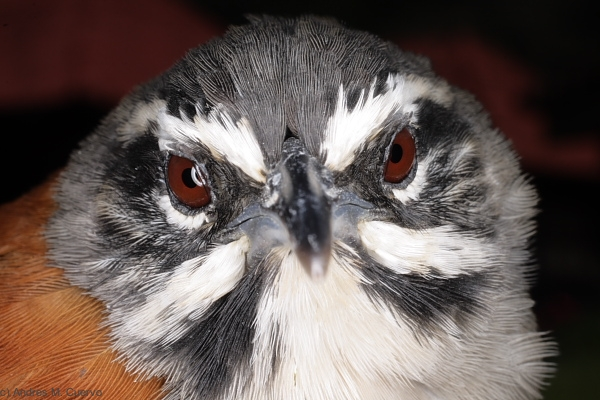

Conservation status
- Least Concern (IUCN 3.1)

Scientific classification
- Kingdom: Animalia
- Phylum: Chordata
- Class: Aves
- Order: Passeriformes
- Family: Troglodytidae
- Genus: Pheugopedius
- Species: P. mystacalis

Binomial name
- Pheugopedius mystacalis (Sclater, PL, 1860)

Synonyms
- Thryothorus mystacalis

Audio
- Song recorded in Ecuador

= Whiskered wren =

Species of bird

The whiskered wren (Pheugopedius mystacalis) is a species of bird in the family Troglodytidae. It is found in Colombia, Ecuador, and Venezuela.

== Taxonomy and systematics ==
The whiskered wren was at one time treated as conspecific with the moustached wren (Pheugopedius genibarbis). It has eight subspecies:

- Pheugopedius mystacalis consobrinus Madarász (1904)
- Pheugopedius mystacalis ruficaudatus Berlepsch (1883)
- Pheugopedius mystacalis tachirensis Phelps & Gilliard (1941)
- Pheugopedius mystacalis saltuensis Bangs (1910)
- Pheugopedius mystacalis yanachae Meyer de Schauensee (1951)
- Pheugopedius mystacalis mystacalis Sclater (1860)
- Pheugopedius mystacalis macrurus Allen (1889)
- Pheugopedius mystacalis amaurogaster Chapman (1914)

== Description ==
The whiskered wren is 16 cm (6.3 in) long; a specimen from Venezuela weighed 29 g (1.0 oz). The nominate adult has a grayish-black crown, olivaceous gray nape, bright chestnut shoulders, back, and rump, and a reddish brown tail with dull black bars. It has a grayish white supercilium, a black line through the eye, blackish cheeks with a white line below and a black malar stripe below that. The chin and throat are off-white, the chest gray darkening to olivaceous gray on the belly, and the flanks reddish gray. The juvenile is duller than the adult with less prominent facial markings and a buffy throat.

The other subspecies have small differences from the nominate. P. m. saltuensis has a grayer chest and less distinct bars on the tail. P. m. yanachae has a slate-gray crown. P. m. macrurus' tail is dingy brown. P. m. amaurogaster is much darker with a sooty brown crown and ochraceous tawny underparts. P. m. consobrinus has a buffy tinge to the supercilium and a buffy neck and chest. P. m. tachirensis is darker than consobrinus with a dusky olive crown and white throat. P. m. ruficaudatus has more buff on its face and no bars on the tail.

== Distribution and habitat ==
The subspecies of the whiskered wren are found thus:

- P. m. consobrinus, the Serranía del Perijá and Andes of western Venezuela from southern Lara south to Mérida
- P. m. ruficaudatus, northern Venezuela from central Falcón and Yaracuy east to Miranda
- P. m. tachirensis, southern Táchira in southwestern Venezuela
- P. m. saltuensis, the West and Central Andes of Colombia
- P. m. yanachae, southwestern Colombia's Nariño Department
- P. m. mystacalis, southern Colombia and western Ecuador
- P. m. macrurus, Colombia, the eastern slope of the Central Andes and western slope of the Eastern Andes
- P. m. amaurogaster eastern slope of Colombia's eastern Andes

The whiskered wren inhabits dense undergrowth such as is found at the edge of humid forest and in regrowing clearings. It shuns the forest interior. In elevation it generally ranges between 1,200 and 2,400 m (3,900 and 7,900 ft) but can be found as high as 2,800 m (9,200 ft) and in Ecuador almost down to sea level.

== Behavior ==
=== Feeding ===
The whiskered wren forages in pairs as high as 10 to 12 m (33 to 39 ft) above ground. Its diet has not been described.

=== Breeding ===
The whiskered wren appears to have a long breeding season; nest building has been observed from December to May. The nest is a large ball of roots and grass with a side entrance, usually placed in the fork of a small tree or in ferns.

=== Vocalization ===
Both sexes of whiskered wren sing in duet, "a splendid series of loud gurgling whistles" . The call is "a deep throaty 'bong bong'" .

== Status ==
The IUCN has assessed the whiskered wren as being of Least Concern. In much of its range it is quite common and it is found in several protected areas.
