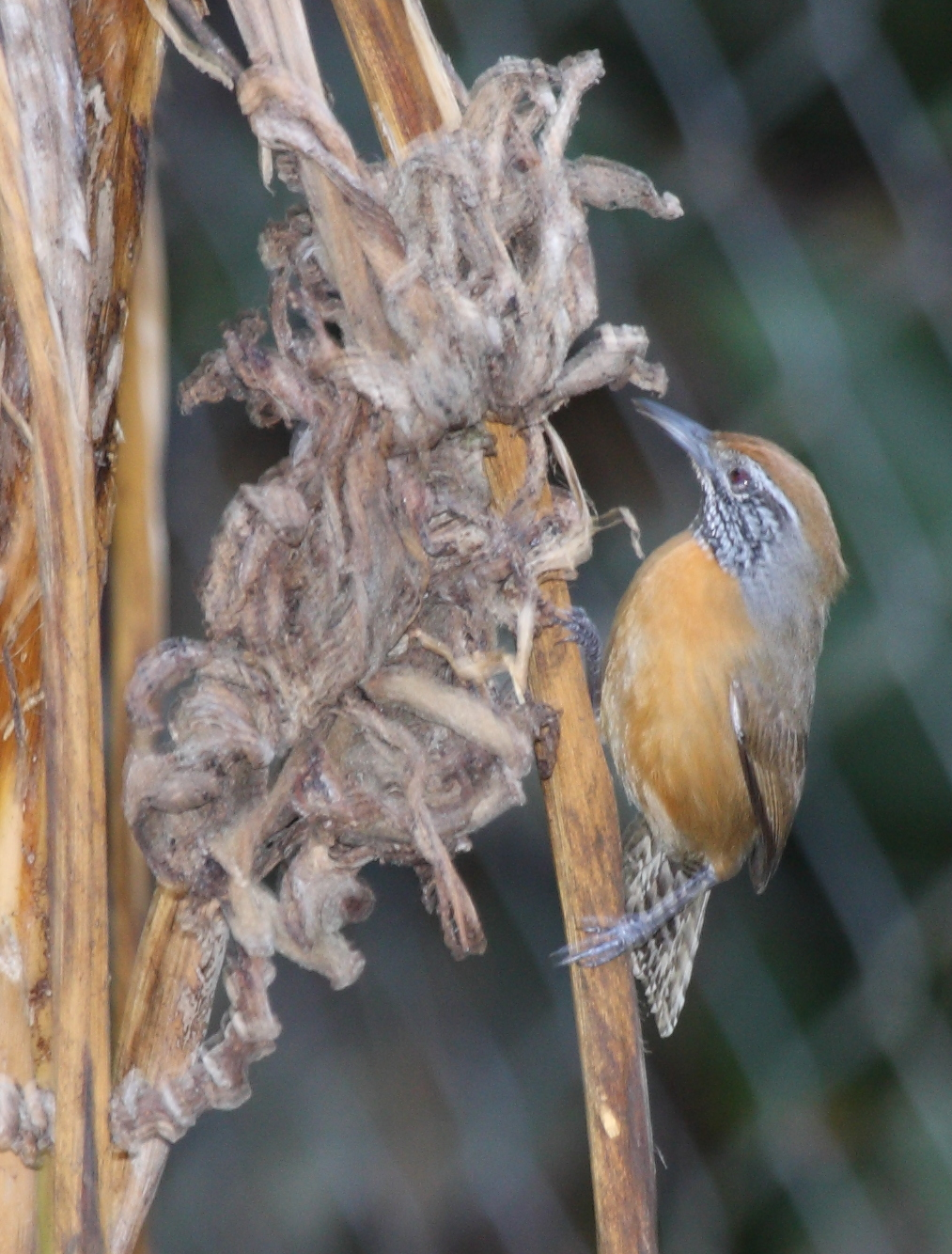
- Rufous-breasted wren (Pheugopedius rutilus)

Scientific classification
- Kingdom: Animalia
- Phylum: Chordata
- Class: Aves
- Order: Passeriformes
- Family: Troglodytidae
- Genus: Pheugopedius; Cabanis, 1851

Type species
- Pheugopedius genibarbis Cabanis, 1851

= Pheugopedius =

Genus of birds

Pheugopedius is a genus of wrens in the family Troglodytidae that are found in Central and South America. These species were formerly placed in the genus Thryothorus.

== Taxonomy ==
A 2006 molecular phylogenetic study by Nigel Mann and coworkers found that the genus Thryothorus, as then constituted, was paraphyletic. The authors proposed splitting Thryothorus into four genera and resurrecting Pheugopedius and Thryophilus as well as introducing a new genus Cantorchilus. This rearrangement left only a single species, the Carolina wren remaining in the genus Thryothorus. The proposal was accepted by other ornithologist. The genus Pheugopedius had been introduced in 1851 by the German ornithologist Jean Cabanis to accommodate a single species, Pheugopedius genibarbis, a junior synonym of Thryothorus genibarbis Swainson, 1837, the moustached wren.

The genus contains the following 13 species:

- Black-throated wren, Pheugopedius atrogularis – Nicaragua to Panama
- Sooty-headed wren, Pheugopedius spadix – Panama and Colombia
- Black-bellied wren, Pheugopedius fasciatoventris – Costa Rica to Colombia
- Plain-tailed wren, Pheugopedius euophrys – southwest Colombia to north Peru
- Grey-browed wren, Pheugopedius schulenbergi – north Peru south of the Río Marañón
- Inca wren, Pheugopedius eisenmanni – Peru
- Moustached wren, Pheugopedius genibarbis – Amazonia
- Whiskered wren, Pheugopedius mystacalis – northwest South America
- Coraya wren, Pheugopedius coraya – north, central Amazonia
- Happy wren, Pheugopedius felix – Mexico
- Spot-breasted wren, Pheugopedius maculipectus – widespread in Middle America
- Rufous-breasted wren, Pheugopedius rutilus – Costa Rica to Colombia and Venezuela
- Speckle-breasted wren, Pheugopedius sclateri – Colombia to Peru
