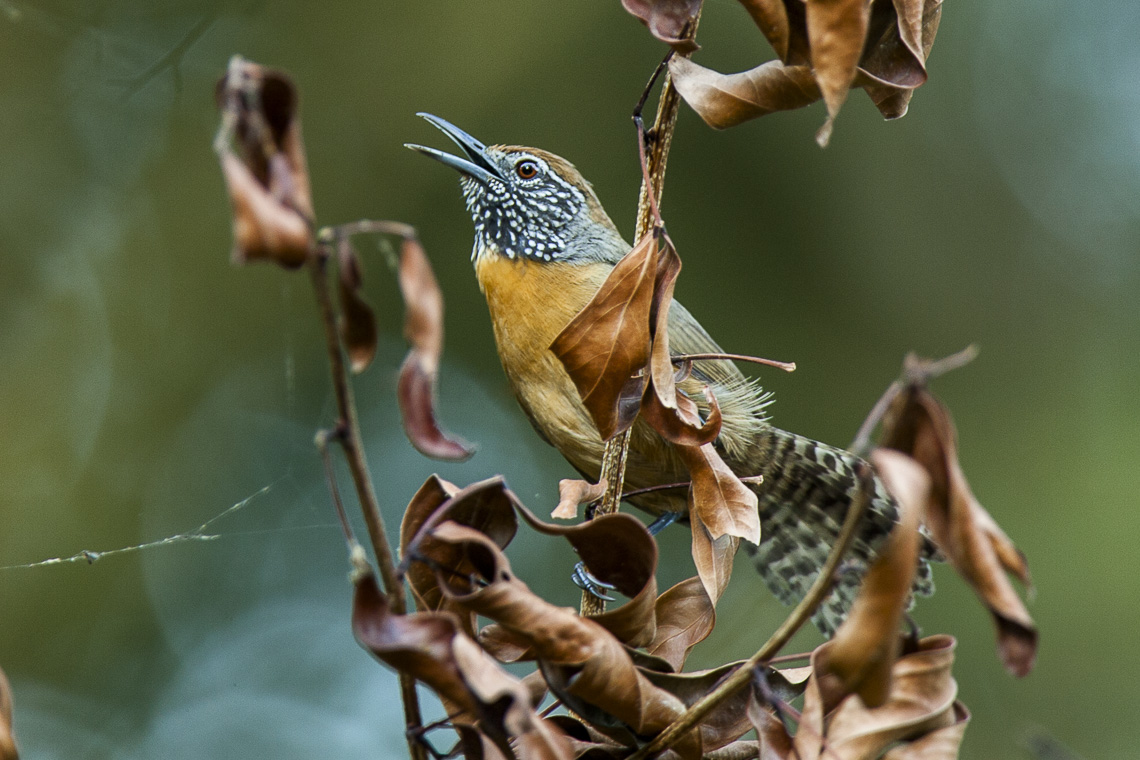
- In Panama

Conservation status
- Least Concern (IUCN 3.1)

Scientific classification
- Kingdom: Animalia
- Phylum: Chordata
- Class: Aves
- Order: Passeriformes
- Family: Troglodytidae
- Genus: Pheugopedius
- Species: P. rutilus

Binomial name
- Pheugopedius rutilus (Vieillot, 1819)

Synonyms
- Thryothorus rutilus

= Rufous-breasted wren =

Species of bird

The rufous-breasted wren (Pheugopedius rutilus) is a small songbird of the family Troglodytidae. It is found in Colombia, Costa Rica, Panama, Trinidad and Tobago, and Venezuela.

== Taxonomy and systematics ==
The rufous-breasted wren was formerly placed in the genus Thryothorus which in the old, broad sense was a motley assemblage of similar-looking wrens. Since being moved into genus Pheugopedius it has at times been treated as conspecific with speckle-breasted wren (P. sclateri) and spot-breasted wren (P. maculipectus). They do form a superspecies.

The rufous-breasted wren has seven subspecies:

- P. r. hyperythrus Salvin & Godman (1880)
- P. r. tobagensis Hellmayr (1921)
- P. r. rutilus Vieillot (1819)
- P. r. intensus Todd (1932)
- P. r. laetus Bangs (1898)
- P. r. interior Todd (1932)
- P. r. hypospodius Salvin & Godman (1880)

== Description ==
Adult rufous-breasted wrens of the nominate subspecies are 14 cm (5.5 in) long and weigh 13.5 to 18.5 g (0.48 to 0.65 oz). Their crowns and upperparts are warm brown; their tail is gray-brown with heavy dark brown bars. They have a white supercilium with a black edge above it. Their face and throat are speckled black and white. The chest is bright chestnut. The rest of the underparts a duller chestnut with a grayish white center to the belly. Juveniles are duller than the adults and the facial markings are less distinct. The facial pattern and rufous breast are unique in the genus.

P. r. hyperythrus is similar to the nominate with the addition of blackish spots on the chest. P. r. laetus also has blackish spots but its underparts are colored richer than those of hyperythrus. P. r. hypospodius compared to the nominate is more reddish on the crown and back and its chest is more tawny and the flanks duller. P. r. interior's underparts are pale ochre and its flanks pale olive brown. P. r. intensus is more richly colored than the nominate and often has some spotting. P. r. tobagensis' bill is heavier than the nominate's; it also has longer wings and a duller chest.

== Distribution and habitat ==
The subspecies of rufous-breasted wren are found thus:

- P. r. hyperythrus, Pacific slope of Costa Rica and western Panama
- P. r. tobagensis, Tobago
- P. r. rutilus, the Coastal Range of northern Venezuela, both slopes of the Andes of northwestern Venezuela, and Trinidad
- P. r. intensus, southwestern Venezuela's Táchira state
- P. r. laetus, far northern Colombia and adjacent northern Venezuela
- P. r. interior, western slope of Colombia's Eastern Andes
- P. r. hypospodius, eastern slope of Colombia's Eastern Andes

The species inhabits rainforest and cloudforest, preferring thickets, second growth, and edges to the forest interior. In elevation it ranges from sea level to 1,900 m (6,200 ft).

== Behavior ==
=== Feeding ===
The rufous-breasted wren forages in pairs or family groups, usually in the undergrowth but sometimes much higher in trees. It primarily eats insects (mainly beetles, bugs and flies) and spiders but has been reported to eat seeds and occasionally frogs and lizards as well.

=== Breeding ===
The rufous-breasted wren's nest is a large sphere of leaves and grass with a side entrance, concealed in tangled vegetation as high as 12 m (39 ft) above ground. The female incubates the clutch of two to four eggs. Only the female incubates the eggs but both parents feed the nestlings.

=== Vocalization ===
The rufous-breasted wren's songs vary throughout its range. Both sexes sing as a duet but sometimes the male sings alone. Some examples of songs are (Costa Rica) , (Panama) , (Colombia) , (Venezuela) , and (Trinidad) . Its call, "churring and raspy", does not seem to vary as much .

== Status ==
The IUCN has assessed the rufous-breasted wren as being of Least Concern. It is considered common through much of its range and occurs in several protected areas.
