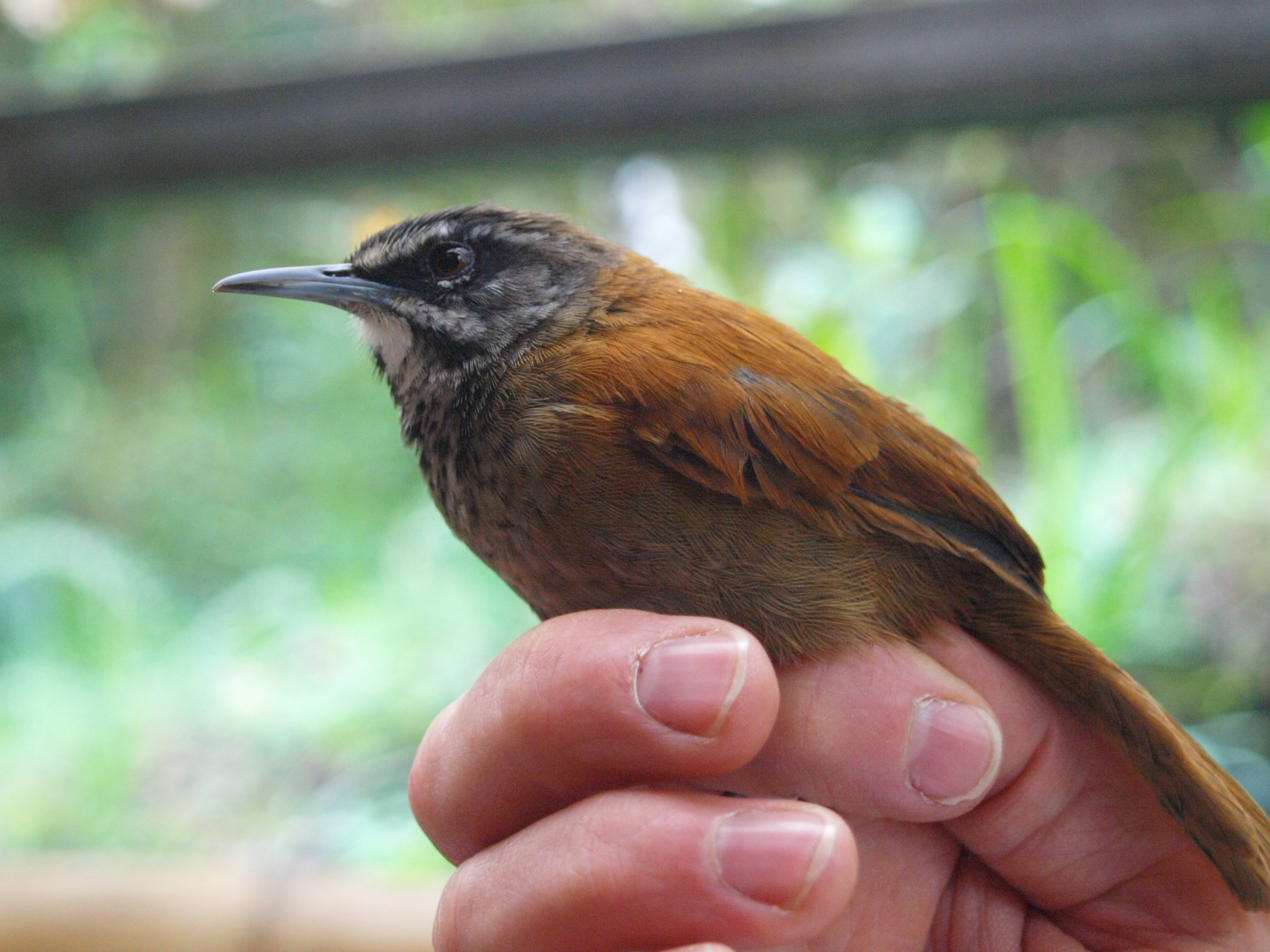

Conservation status
- Least Concern (IUCN 3.1)

Scientific classification
- Kingdom: Animalia
- Phylum: Chordata
- Class: Aves
- Order: Passeriformes
- Family: Troglodytidae
- Genus: Pheugopedius
- Species: P. euophrys

Binomial name
- Pheugopedius euophrys (PL Sclater, 1860)
- Range of plain-tailed wren year-round

Synonyms
- Thryothorus euophrys

Audio

= Plain-tailed wren =

Species of songbird

The plain-tailed wren (Pheugopedius euophrys) is a species of songbird in the family Troglodytidae. It has a mostly rufous body with a gray, black, and white striped head. It is found in the Andes of southern Colombia, Ecuador, and northern Peru. Its natural habitat is subtropical or tropical moist montane forests. Plain-tailed wrens are so-called bamboo specialists and live almost exclusively in chusquea bamboo thickets. Like other wrens, its diet consists mainly of insects with some seeds and berries.

== Taxonomy ==
The plain-tailed wren belongs to the order Passeriformes and the family Troglodytidae. Three subspecies are recognised:

- P. e. euophrys (Sclater, PL, 1860) – southwest Colombia and west Ecuador
- P. e. longipes (Allen, JA, 1889) – central east Ecuador
- P. e. atriceps Chapman, 1924 – north Peru north of the Río Marañón

The grey-browed wren was formerly considered as a subspecies but is now treated as a separate species based on the distinctive vocalizations and some morphological differences.

== Description ==
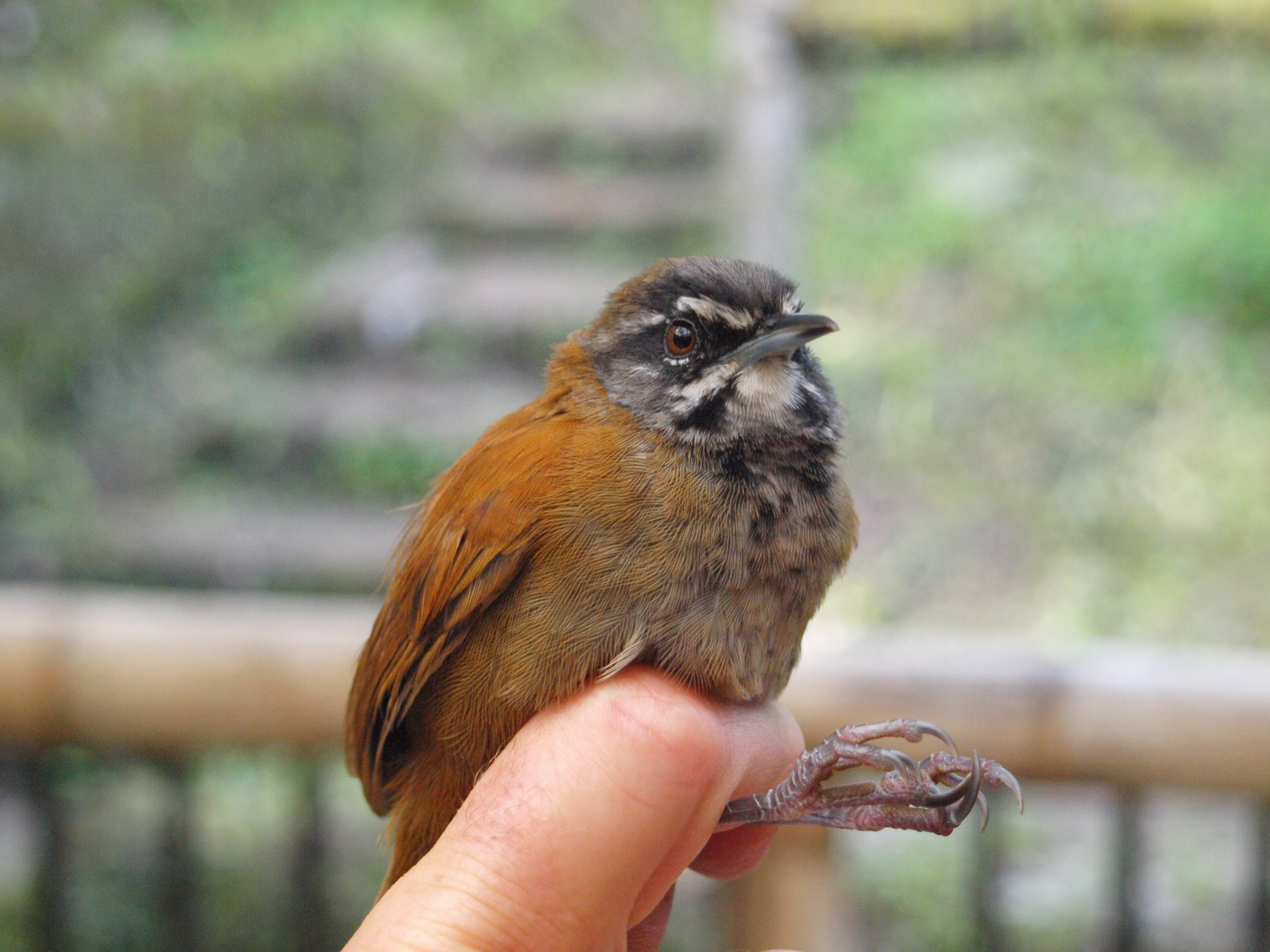
Plain-tailed wren at Bellavista, Ecuador

=== Physical ===
The plain-tailed wren has an unflattened wing of 64–71 mm and weighs from 20 to 36 g. The back, wings, and tail are rufous, with an olive cast on the back. The belly and other underparts are buffy-gray, and the head is gray with black and white stripes (superciliary, malar, and submalar stripes). The bill is gray and slightly decurved. The plain-tailed is large for a wren, but shows the characteristic short tail shared by the family. As the name suggests, it is unique among wrens because its tail lacks any barring.

Plain-tailed wrens on the western slope of the Andes tend to have heavy black spotting on the breast, while eastern-slope birds show no such markings.

=== Vocalizations ===
The plain-tailed wren sings a rolling, repetitive song. Singing pairs of plain-tailed wrens coordinate such that the duets between males and females alternate syllables so quickly it sounds as if a single bird is singing. Research finds the brains of both birds process the entire duet, not just each bird's own contribution. Groups of males and females also in groups of up to seven individuals chorus in synchrony. Each bird has a repertoire of roughly 20 phrases, and they, in synchrony, select the same type at the same time as others of their sex. Songs can last up to 2 min, during which individuals join in and drop out. Two-part antiphonal choruses usually take an ABCD form, where the male contributes the A and C phrases and the female sings during B and D. Group choruses are thought to be used in mutual territory defense to intimidate intruding individuals.

== Distribution and habitat ==
The plain-tailed wren prefers chusquea bamboo thickets in tropical moist montane forests. It also frequents recently disturbed areas, such as fresh landslides, presumably because of the increase in insect activity. It is most commonly found at elevations between 2200 and 3200 metres. It is found mainly in Ecuador, but its range extends into southern Colombia and northern Peru. The plain-tailed wren is listed as a species of least concern. It is common within its range.

== Behavior ==
=== Diet ===
The plain-tailed wren is mainly insectivorous, like most other wrens. Its diet can include seeds and berries, but these are not its primary food source. The bird is most often observed foraging on or near the ground in chusquea bamboo undergrowth, in search of invertebrates.

=== Breeding ===
Plain-tailed wrens are thought to use song duetting as a form of bonding and/or mate guarding. No other information regarding mating systems or nesting behavior was found.
