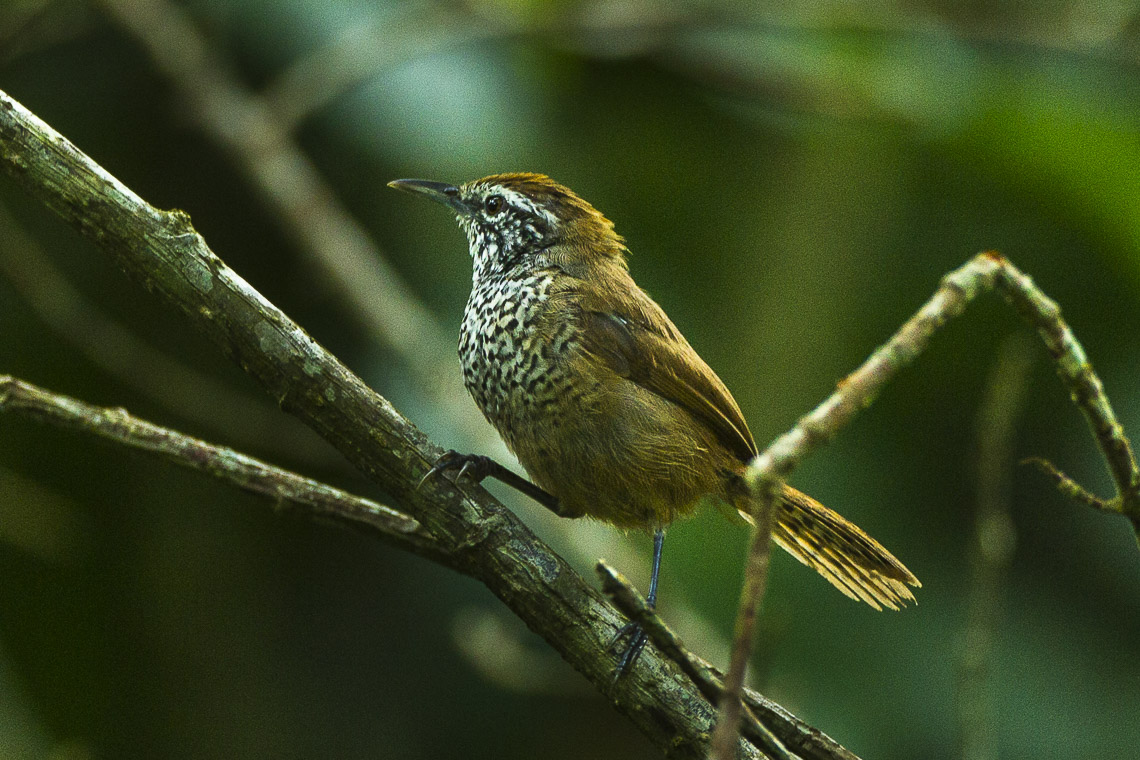
- In Chiapas, Mexico

Conservation status
- Least Concern (IUCN 3.1)

Scientific classification
- Domain: Eukaryota
- Kingdom: Animalia
- Phylum: Chordata
- Class: Aves
- Order: Passeriformes
- Family: Troglodytidae
- Genus: Pheugopedius
- Species: P. maculipectus

Binomial name
- Pheugopedius maculipectus (Lafresnaye, 1845)

Synonyms
- Thryothorus maculipectus; Thryothorus paucimaculatus; Thryothorus colombianus

= Spot-breasted wren =

Species of bird found in Mexico and Central America

The spot-breasted wren (Pheugopedius maculipectus) is a species of bird in the family Troglodytidae. It is found in Belize, Costa Rica, El Salvador, Guatemala, Honduras, Mexico, and Nicaragua.

== Taxonomy and systematics ==
The spot-breasted wren has at times been treated as conspecific with rufous-breasted wren (P. rutilus) and speckle-breasted wren (P. sclateri). They do form a superspecies.

The International Ornithological Committee (IOC) recognizes five subspecies:

- P. m. microstictus Griscom (1930)
- P. m. maculopectus Lafresnaye (1845)
- P. m. canobrunneus Ridgway (1887)
- P. m. umbrinus Ridgway (1887)
- P. m. petersi Griscom (1930)

The Clements taxonomy recognizes a sixth subspecies:

- P. m. varians Griscom (1930)

BirdLife International (BLI) does not recognize either petersi or varians, considering them "indistinguishable from umbrinus".

== Description ==
The spot-breasted wren is 12.5 to 14 cm (4.9 to 5.5 in) long; males weigh 14.3 to 16.8 g (0.50 to 0.59 oz) and females 12.4 to 16.2 g (0.44 to 0.57 oz). Adults of the nominate subspecies have a reddish brown crown and upperparts; the rump is more chestnut. Their tail is dull brown with narrow dark bars. They have a white supercilium and the rest of the face and neck are streaked with black and white. The throat, chest, and the center of the belly are pale gray with black spots and the flanks and lower belly are orange-buff with no spots. Juveniles are paler than the adult and the facial markings and spots are less extensive and dimmer.

P. m. microstictus is not as reddish as the nominate and the spots on its breast are smaller and fewer. P. m. canobrunneus is paler than the nominate and its crown is light buffy cinnamon. P. m. umbrinus (including petersi and varians) is larger and darker than the nominate.

== Distribution and habitat ==
The subspecies of spot-breasted wren, including the two that are not universally accepted, are found thus:

- P. m. microstictus, northeastern Mexico from southeastern Nuevo León and central Tamaulipas states south to eastern San Luis Potosí and northern Veracruz
- P. m. maculopectus, eastern Mexico from Veracruz south to Puebla and northern Oaxaca
- P. m. canobrunneus, the Yucatán Peninsula, northern Belize, and Guatemala's Petén Department
- P. m. umbrinus, southern Mexico south through southern Belize, most of Guatemala, El Salvador, northern and central Honduras, and the Caribbean slopes of Nicaragua and extreme northern Costa Rica
- P. m. petersi, northern Honduras south through Nicaragua to northern Costa Rica
- P. m. varians, Pacific slope of Chiapas, Mexico, and Guatemala and El Salvador

The spot-breasted wren occurs in a wide variety of habitats including humid coastal and dry forest (intact, disturbed, and regrowing) and cocoa and citrus plantations. In elevation it ranges from sea level to 1,300 m (4,300 ft) in Mexico and Honduras but only up to 200 m (660 ft) in Costa Rica.

== Behavior ==
=== Feeding ===
The spot-breasted wren forages at low levels in dense vegetation, usually in pairs or family groups. Its diet is not well defined but is probably mostly invertebrates.

=== Breeding ===
Some details of the spot-breasted wren's breeding phenology are known. Its breeding season varies by latitude. Its nest is dome-shaped, has a side entrance, and is typically placed in the crotch of a tree or in ferns up to 6 m (20 ft) above the ground. The clutch size is three to four. Both sexes feed the young.

=== Vocalization ===
The spot-breasted wren's song is " a cheerful series of clear whistling gurgles" given by both sexes .

== Status ==
The IUCN has assessed the spot-breasted wren as being of Least Concern. Its population is estimated to be at least 500,000 individuals. However, its "population trend is difficult to determine because of uncertainty over the impacts of habitat modification on population sizes."
