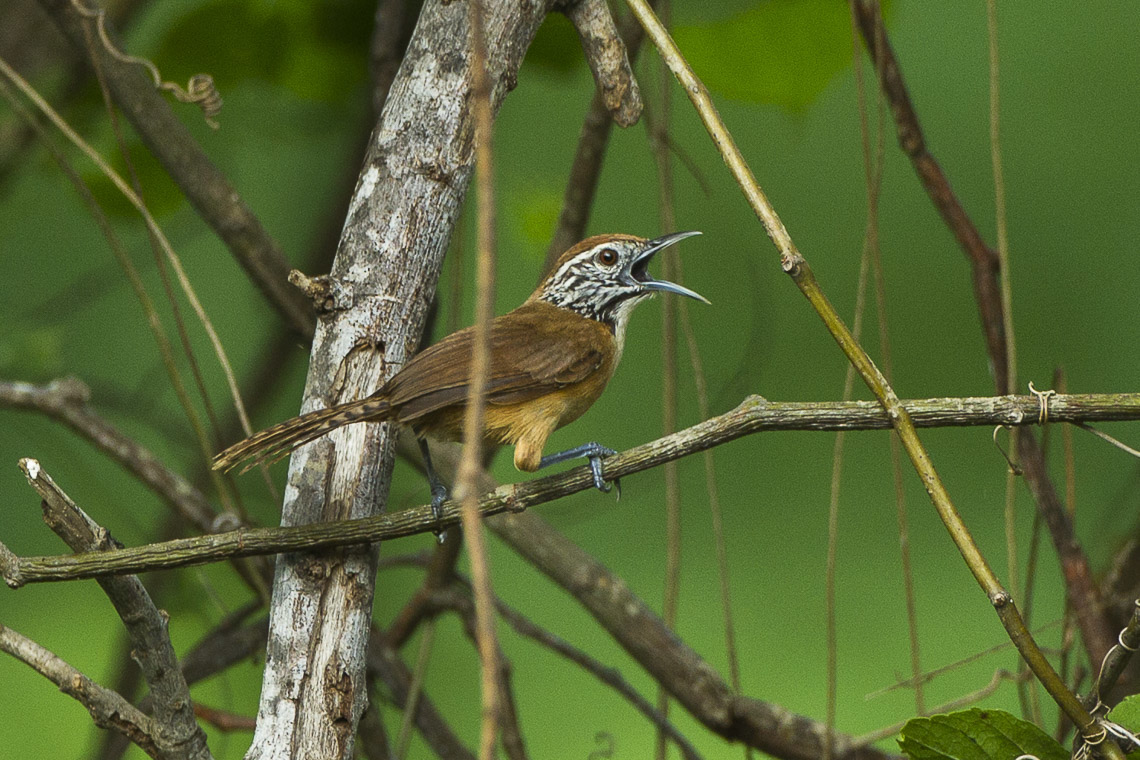

Conservation status
- Least Concern (IUCN 3.1)

Scientific classification
- Kingdom: Animalia
- Phylum: Chordata
- Class: Aves
- Order: Passeriformes
- Family: Troglodytidae
- Genus: Pheugopedius
- Species: P. felix

Binomial name
- Pheugopedius felix (Sclater, 1860)

Synonyms
- Thryothorus felix

Audio
- Song recorded near Pluma Hidalgo, Mexico

= Happy wren =

Species of bird

The happy wren (Pheugopedius felix) is a species of bird in the family Troglodytidae. It is endemic to the Pacific slope of western Mexico, from the state of Sonora to the state of Oaxaca, and also on islands west of the Mexican coast. As with other species of Pheugopedius, older sources (e.g. Howell and Webb) classify it within genus Thryothorus. Some authorities have treated it as a subspecies of P. rutilus or P. sclateri. There is significant geographical variation, and six subspecies are recognized: P. f. sonorae is found in southern Sonora and northern Sinaloa; P. f. pallidus is found in central Sinaloa, western Durango and southwards to Jalisco and Michoacán; P. f. lawrencii and P. f. magdalenae are found on different islands of the Islas Marías; P. f. grandis is found in the Balsas River basin, and the nominate subspecies, P. f. felix in southwestern Mexico from Jalisco to Oaxaca.

== Description ==
There is little difference between the sexes as adults. They are fairly typical small wrens, with a black and white striped face, a downward curving bill, chestnut upperparts and cream underparts. Howell and Webb give its length as 12.5 – 14 cm.

== Habitat ==
Its natural habitats are subtropical or tropical dry forests, subtropical or tropical moist lowland forests, subtropical or tropical dry shrubland, and heavily degraded former forest. Its nest is typical of the Pheugopedius wrens, being roughly spherical with an entrance chute at one end, pointing downwards.

== Behavior ==
=== Feeding ===
The happy wren is primarily insectivorous, but may consume vegetable matter, including fruit, as part of its diet. Typically forages less than 2 meters from the ground, but occasionally will forage up to 10 meters.

=== Breeding ===
The mainland population breeds in late May and June, while island populations breed several weeks later. Its nest is a bag of natural fibres built over a twig 3-18 meters above the ground. It often constructs its nest near wasp nests or in an Acacia tree defended by Pseudomyrmex ants. It occasionally nests on the ground, with island populations doing so more frequently. Their nests usually contain a clutch of 5 bluish-white eggs.

=== Vocalizations ===
Like many wrens, happy wrens produce a complex song, described as a "rollicking, gurgling whistle." Songs are less varied among island populations. Pairs of happy wrens primarily use their duet songs for cooperative territory defense.
