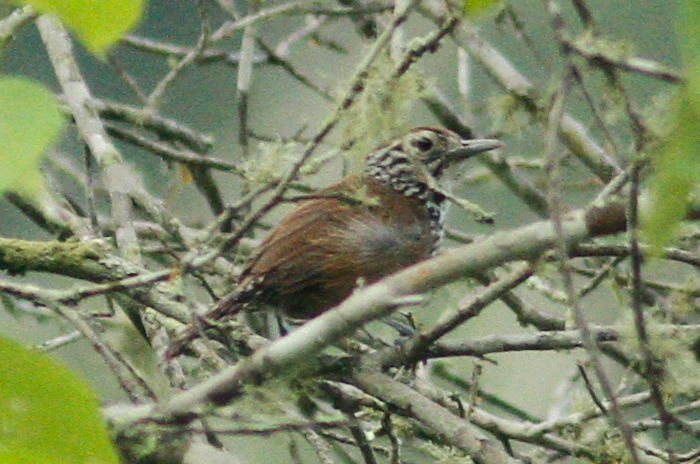
- photo captured in Ecuador

Conservation status
- Least Concern (IUCN 3.1)

Scientific classification
- Kingdom: Animalia
- Phylum: Chordata
- Class: Aves
- Order: Passeriformes
- Family: Troglodytidae
- Genus: Pheugopedius
- Species: P. sclateri

Binomial name
- Pheugopedius sclateri (Taczanowski, 1879)

Synonyms
- Thryothorus sclateri

Audio
- Song recorded in Ecuador

= Speckle-breasted wren =

Species of bird

The speckle-breasted wren (Pheugopedius sclateri) is a species of bird in the family Troglodytidae. It is found in Colombia, Ecuador, and Peru.

== Taxonomy and systematics ==
The speckle-breasted wren has at times been treated as conspecific with rufous-breasted wren (P. rutilus) and spot-breasted wren (P. maculipectus). They do form a superspecies.

The International Ornithological Committee (IOC) and the Clements taxonomy recognize three subspecies. The names in parentheses are from Clements.

- Pheugopedius sclateri sclateri (Marañon) Taczanowski (1879)
- Pheugopedius sclateri columbianus (Colombian) Chapman (1924)
- Pheugopedius sclateri paucimaculatus (speckle-breasted) Sharpe (1882)

BirdLife International (BLI) treats all three subspecies as separate species and calls them the "Maranon", "Colombian", and "speckle-breasted" wrens.

== Description ==
The nominate P. s. sclateri is 14.5 to 15.5 cm (5.7 to 6.1 in) long and weighs 20 g (0.71 oz). Adults have a reddish brown crown and a medium brown back and rump. Their tail has alternating gray and dull black bars. They have a narrow white supercilium and a dark eyestripe; the sides of the face and neck are mottled black and white. Their underparts from the chin down through the lower belly have fine black and white bars. The lower belly and flanks have bars but they are more diffuse, and the flanks also have a buff wash. Juveniles are similar to the adults but their underside's bars do not go as far down the belly.

Pheugopedius sclateri columbianus is 13 to 14 cm (5.1 to 5.5 in) long. Adults have uniform brown upperparts with a rufous tinge to the crown and their tails have broad dark bars. They have a narrow white supercilium. Their face and most of their underparts are white with black bars and spots; the flanks are dark buff.

Pheugopedius sclateri paucimaculatus is 13.5 to 15.5 cm (5.3 to 6.1 in) long. Males average 12.7 g (0.45 oz) and females 10 g (0.35 oz). Adults have uniform brown upperparts with black bars on the tail. They have a narrow white supercilium and black and white speckled cheeks. Most of the underparts are whitish, with a heavily black-speckled breast, and the flanks are rufescent. The juvenile is similar but its breast is not as heavily speckled.

== Distribution and habitat ==
The subspecies of speckle-breasted wren are found thus:

- Pheugopedius sclateri sclateri (Marañon), the drainage of the Marañon River in extreme southern Ecuador and northern Peru
- Pheugopedius sclateri columbianus (Colombian), Colombia; separately the western slopes of the Central and Eastern Andes
- Pheugopedius sclateri paucimaculatus (speckle-breasted), south from Ecuador's Manabí Province into Peru's Department of Piura

The three subspecies occur in somewhat different habitats. P. s. sclateri inhabits the undergrowth of dry forest up to approximately 1,600 m (5,200 ft) elevation. P. s. columbianus inhabits the thick understory of forest borders and open woodland at elevations between 1,300 and 2,000 m (4,300 and 6,600 ft). P. s. paucimaculatus inhabits the interior and edges of deciduous semi-humid woodland, especially those with a dense understory. It ranges from the lowlands to approximately 1,600 m (5,200 ft) in Ecuador and to 2,000 m (6,600 ft) in Peru.

== Behavior ==
=== Feeding ===
Pheugopedius sclateri paucimaculatus is known to eat insects, and the other two subspecies are assumed to also be mostly or completely insectivorous. It and P. s. sclateri are known to forage in the understory, though the former also sometimes goes higher. They are usually in pairs and often join mixed-species foraging flocks. P. s. columbianus is assumed to have a similar strategy.

=== Breeding ===
Only P. s. paucimaculatus' breeding phenology has been studied. Its breeding season apparently spans from April to September, based on the dates of observation of an active nest, of adults carrying food, and of recent fledglings. The one described nest was enclosed, made from sticks, vines, leaves, and lichen, and was on the ground; it held four eggs.

=== Vocalization ===
The songs of the three subspecies of speckle-breasted wren have no known differences. The song is "a series of fast, repeated phrases" sung by both sexes . The call is "a musical rising trill" .

== Status ==
The IUCN has separately assessed all of the subspecies of speckle-breasted wren as being of Least Concern. All three have relatively small ranges. P. s. sclateri and P. s. paucimaculatus occur in several protected areas, are fairly common to common, and appear to have enough of their preferred habitats. However, the population of P. s. columbianus is believed to be decreasing due to habitat fragmentation and destruction.
