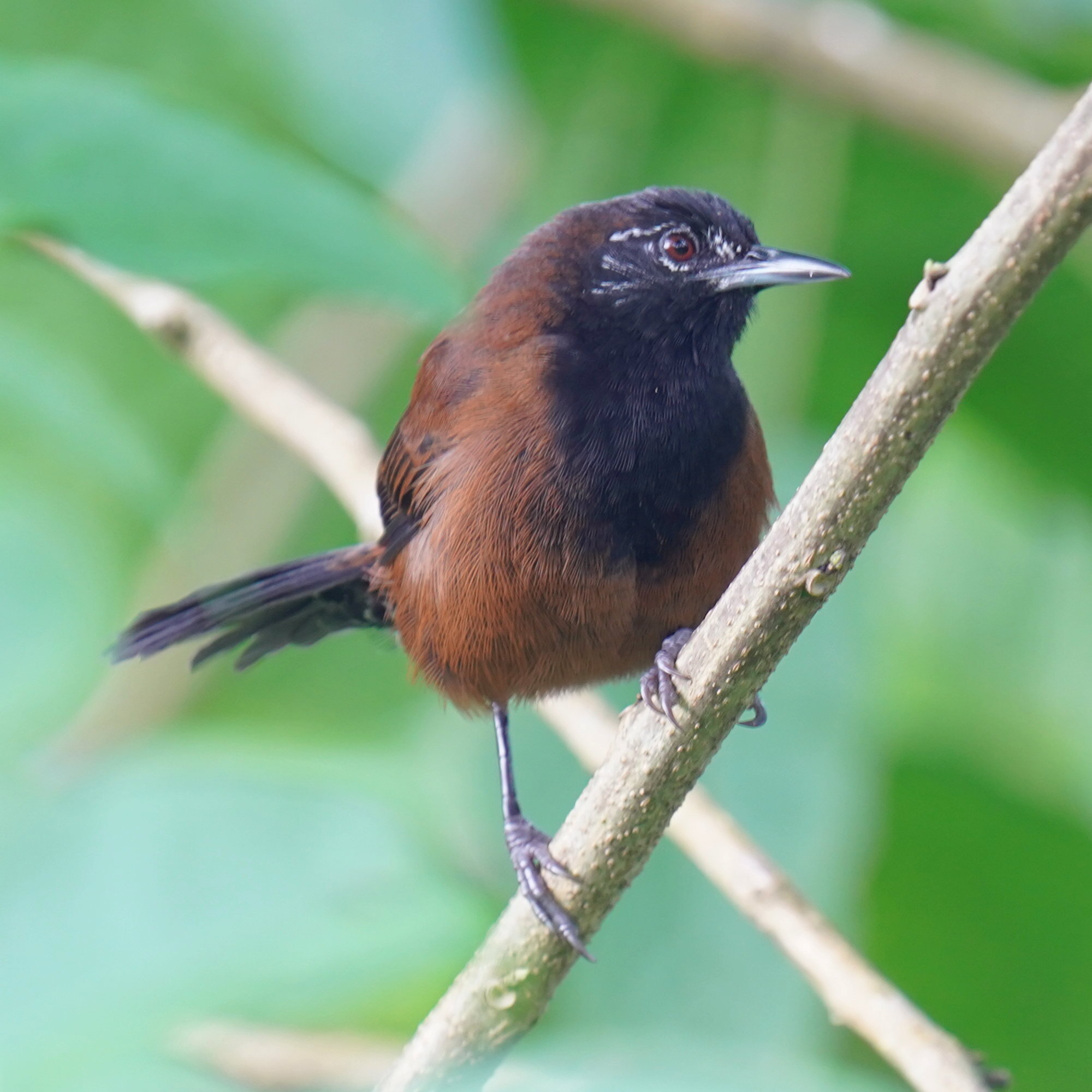

Conservation status
- Least Concern (IUCN 3.1)

Scientific classification
- Kingdom: Animalia
- Phylum: Chordata
- Class: Aves
- Order: Passeriformes
- Family: Troglodytidae
- Genus: Pheugopedius
- Species: P. atrogularis

Binomial name
- Pheugopedius atrogularis (Salvin, 1865)

Synonyms
- Thryothorus atrogularis

= Black-throated wren =

Species of bird

The black-throated wren (Pheugopedius atrogularis) is a species of bird in the family Troglodytidae. It is found in Costa Rica, Nicaragua, and Panama.

== Taxonomy and systematics ==
The black-throated wren was previously treated as conspecific with the sooty-headed wren (Pheugopedius spadix) but significant differences in their plumage, song, and ranges demanded their separation. The species is monotypic.

== Description ==
The black-throated wren is 15 cm (5.9 in) long; males weigh 24.3 to 27.3 g (0.86 to 0.96 oz) and females 22.5 g (0.79 oz). Adults have dark reddish brown crowns and upperparts that are redder on the rump. Their tails are blackish brown with faint buffy markings on the other feathers. Much of the face is black with white markings. The chin, throat, and upper chest are black, the mid-chest is reddish brown, and the lower chest and belly are reddish chestnut. Juveniles are essentially dull dark brown overall, with less contrast between the upper- and underparts than the adults.

== Distribution and habitat ==
The black-throated wren was long thought to be found from southeastern Nicaragua through eastern Costa Rica into western Panama. However, starting in 2010 the species has been observed in northern Nicaragua and eastern Honduras. It inhabits lowland and foothill forest, especially second growth, and is often associated with water.

== Behavior ==
=== Feeding ===
The black-throated wren forages near the ground in dense vegetation. Its diet has not been extensively documented but it appears to be mostly insects and spiders.

=== Breeding ===
Very little has been published about the black-throated wren's breeding phenology. Its breeding season in Costa Rica appears to span from April or May into August.

=== Vocalization ===
The black-throated wren's song is "a distinctive series of rich whistles ending in a trill" . Its calls include "a fast, nasal to wooden rattling 'praaaaht'" and a "guttural rolling 'beewr' or 'bweeurr'".

== Status ==
The IUCN has assessed the black-throated wren as being of Least Concern. However, "[its] population is suspected to be in decline owing to ongoing habitat destruction and fragmentation."
