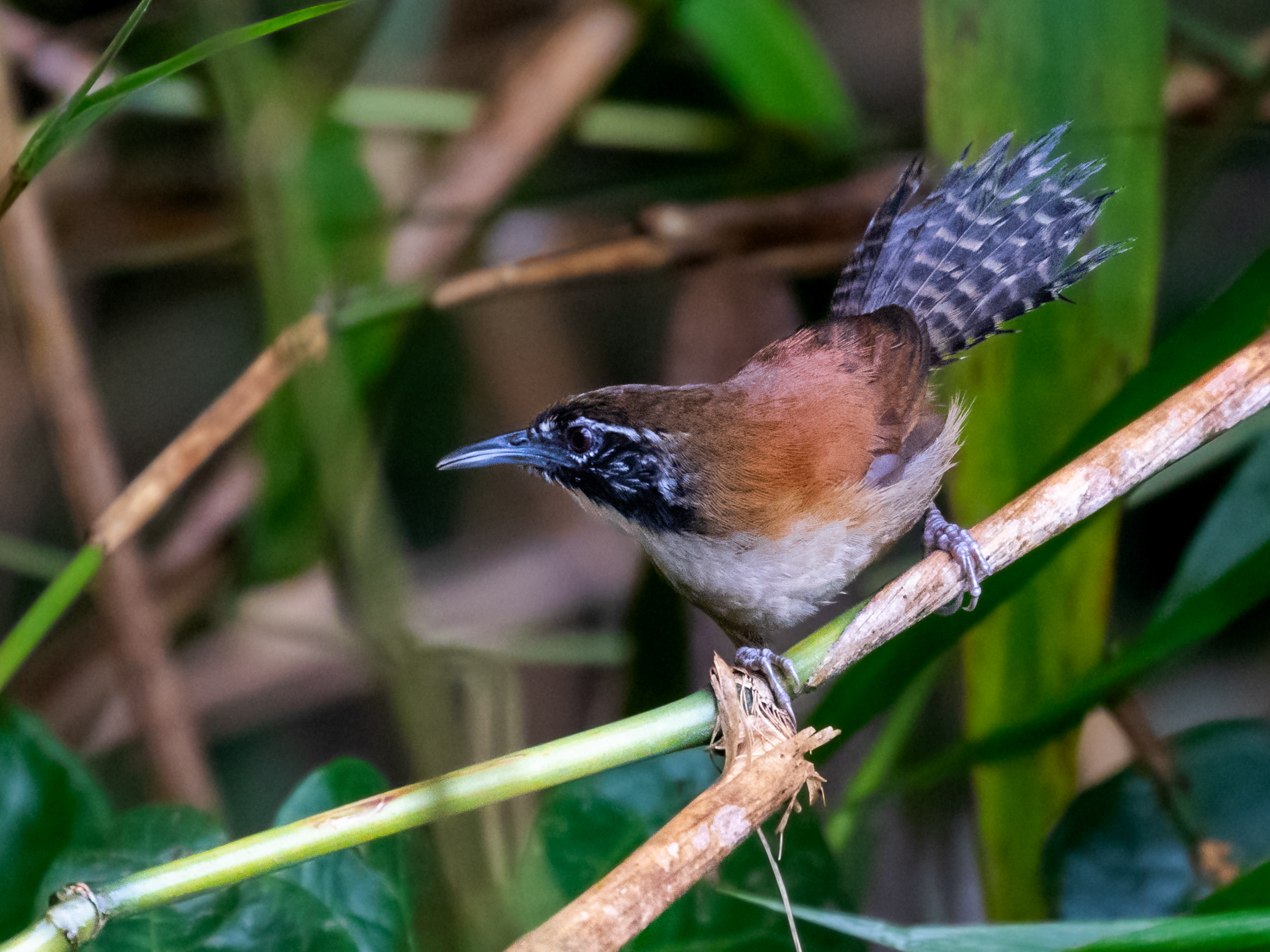

Conservation status
- Least Concern (IUCN 3.1)

Scientific classification
- Kingdom: Animalia
- Phylum: Chordata
- Class: Aves
- Order: Passeriformes
- Family: Troglodytidae
- Genus: Pheugopedius
- Species: P. coraya

Binomial name
- Pheugopedius coraya (Gmelin, JF, 1789)

Synonyms
- Thryothorus coraya

Audio
- Call recorded in Ecuador

= Coraya wren =

Species of bird

The coraya wren (Pheugopedius coraya) is a species of bird in the family Troglodytidae, the wrens.

== Taxonomy ==
The coraya wren was formally described in 1789 by the German naturalist Johann Friedrich Gmelin in his revised and expanded edition of Carl Linnaeus's Systema Naturae. He placed it with the thrushes in the genus Turdus and coined the binomial name Turdus coraya. Gmelin based his description on "Le Coraya" from Cayenne in French Guiana that had been described in 1778 by the French polymath the Comte de Buffon in his Histoire Naturelle des Oiseaux. A hand-coloured engraving by François-Nicolas Martinet was published to accompany Buffon's text. The word "coraya" as the specific epithet and in the common name is a homophone for the French queue rayée meaning "barred tail". The coraya wren is now one of twelve placed in the genus Pheugopedius that was introduced in 1851 by the German ornithologist Jean Cabanis.

Ten subspecies are recognised:

- P. c. obscurus (Zimmer, JT & Phelps, WH, 1947) – east Venezuela
- P. c. caurensis (Berlepsch & Hartert, EJO, 1902) – east Colombia, south Venezuela and northwest Brazil
- P. c. barrowcloughianus (Aveledo & Peréz, 1994) – southeast Venezuela
- P. c. ridgwayi (Berlepsch, 1889) – northeast, east Venezuela and west Guyana
- P. c. coraya (Gmelin, JF, 1789) – the Guianas and north Brazil
- P. c. herberti (Ridgway, 1888) – northeast Brazil south of the Amazon
- P. c. griseipectus (Sharpe, 1882) – east Ecuador, northeast Peru and west Brazil
- P. c. amazonicus (Sharpe, 1882) – east Peru
- P. c. albiventris (Taczanowski, 1882) – north Peru
- P. c. cantator (Taczanowski, 1874) – central Peru

== Distribution and habitat ==
It is found in Amazonian northern and northwestern South America, the northern Amazon Basin and the Guianas, of Guyana, French Guiana, Suriname, and Amazonian southeast Colombia, eastern Ecuador, and north and central Peru; also the southeastern Orinoco River Basin of Venezuela. Its natural habitats are subtropical or tropical moist lowland forests, subtropical or tropical swamps, and heavily degraded former forest.

Besides the northern Amazon Basin and the Guianas including the Guiana Highlands, the contiguous range in the southeastern Amazon Basin extends to Maranhão state Brazil, and covers the downstream third of the three north-flowing river systems: the Tapajós River, Xingu River, and the Araguaia-Tocantins River system; in the Andean west, in central Peru, the range extends southward, upstream 1300 km into the Ucayali River drainage region of central Peru.

The two non-Amazon Basin areas are the Caribbean Orinoco River of Venezuela, (in the southeast), and the north-flowing Atlantic areas of the Guianas. The coraya wren can be found on Ilha de Marajo at the Amazon River's outlet.

== Description ==
It is a medium-sized wren, rufous-(chestnut)-brown overall with a medium length black-and-white banded tail. It has a buff white breast, white throat and an overall black head, flecked with white feathers; notably a narrow upper bright white eye stripe, and a narrow white eye ring of white feathers. It has a medium length black decurved bill, black eyes, and gray-black legs. It is darker brown on its back, deep brown-blackish wings, and lighter buff brown on its sides.

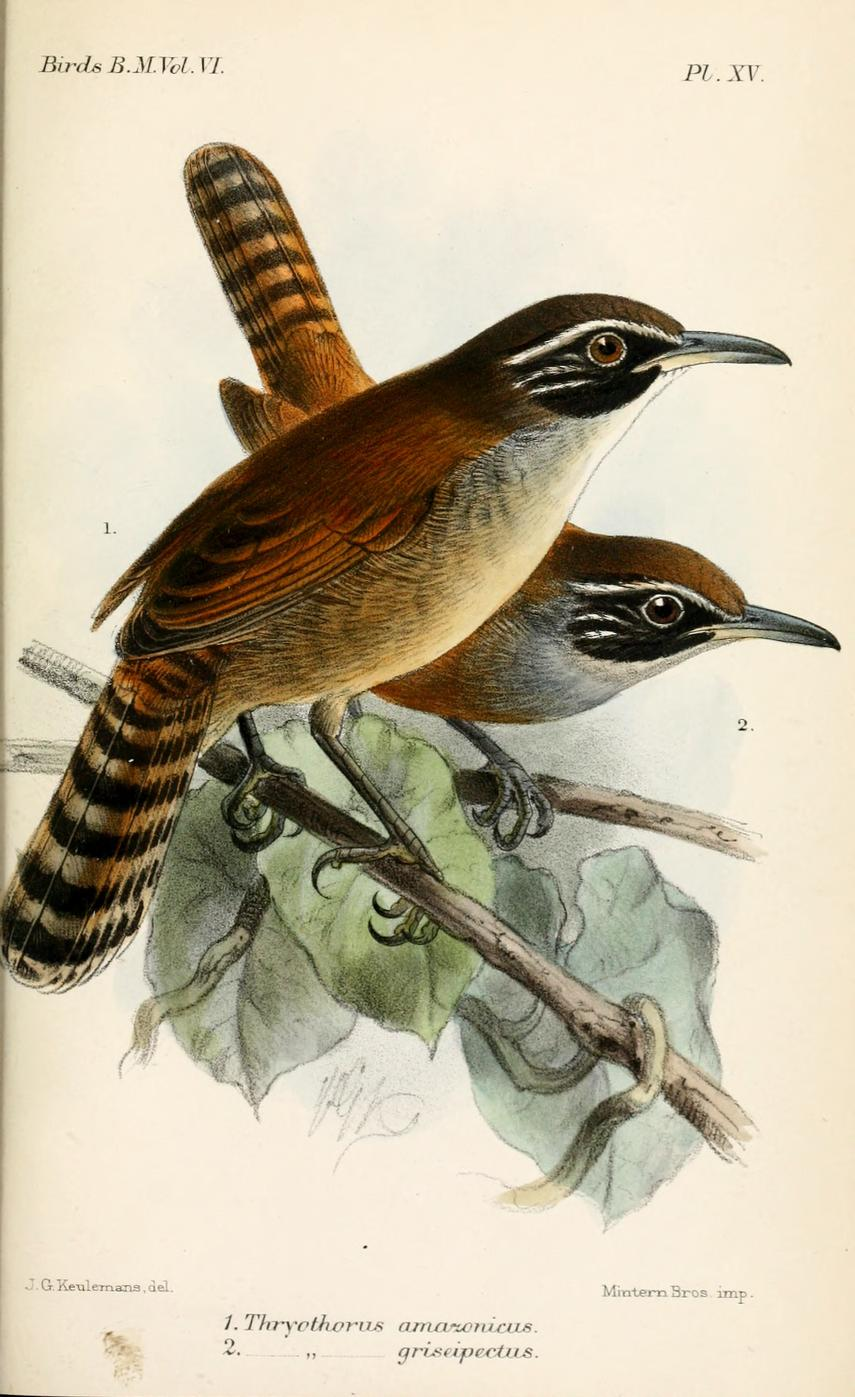
Subspecies P. c. amazonicus (in front), and P. c. griseipectus (behind); illustration by Keulemans, 1881
