= Grey-browed wren =

Conservation status
- Least Concern (IUCN 3.1)

Scientific classification
- Kingdom: Animalia
- Phylum: Chordata
- Class: Aves
- Order: Passeriformes
- Family: Troglodytidae
- Genus: Pheugopedius
- Species: P. schulenbergi

Binomial name
- Pheugopedius schulenbergi (Parker, TA & O'Neill, 1985)

Species of bird

The grey-browed wren (Pheugopedius schulenbergi) is a small passerine bird in the wren family Troglodytidae. It is found in northern Peru north of the Río Marañón. It was formerly considered to be a subspecies of the plain-tailed wren.

== Taxonomy ==
The grey-browed wren was formally described in 1985 by the American ornithologists Theodore A. Parker III and John P. O'Neill based on a specimen that had been collected at an altitude of 2,713 m (8,901 ft) in the Cordillera de Colán of the Amazonas region of northern Peru. They considered the specimen to be a subspecies of the plain-tailed wren and coined the trinomial name Thryothorus euophrys schulenbergi where the specific epithet was chosen to honour Thomas S. Schulenberg who had collected the holotype. It is now treated as a separate species based on the distinctive vocalizations and some morphological differences.

== Description ==
A medium-sized wren, it is 16–16.5 cm (6.3–6.5 in) in length. The male is larger than the female, weighing 34–38 g (1.2–1.3 oz) and 29.5–34 g (1.04–1.20 oz), respectively. In coloration, it is mostly brown and grey with a black and white face.

== Distribution ==
The grey-browed wren inhabits the Andes in northern to central Peru, at elevations 1,800–3,500 m (5,900–11,500 ft) but more commonly at 2,200–3,200 m (7,200–10,500 ft). It is a resident species, with migration not reported.

== Behavior ==
It forages in pairs or small groups, only occasionally in mixed-species flocks. It likely consumes small invertebrates including beetles and caterpillars. The grey-browed wren forms groups of 2–7 birds, typically a pair and its offspring. Nests and eggs of this species have yet to be formally described.
