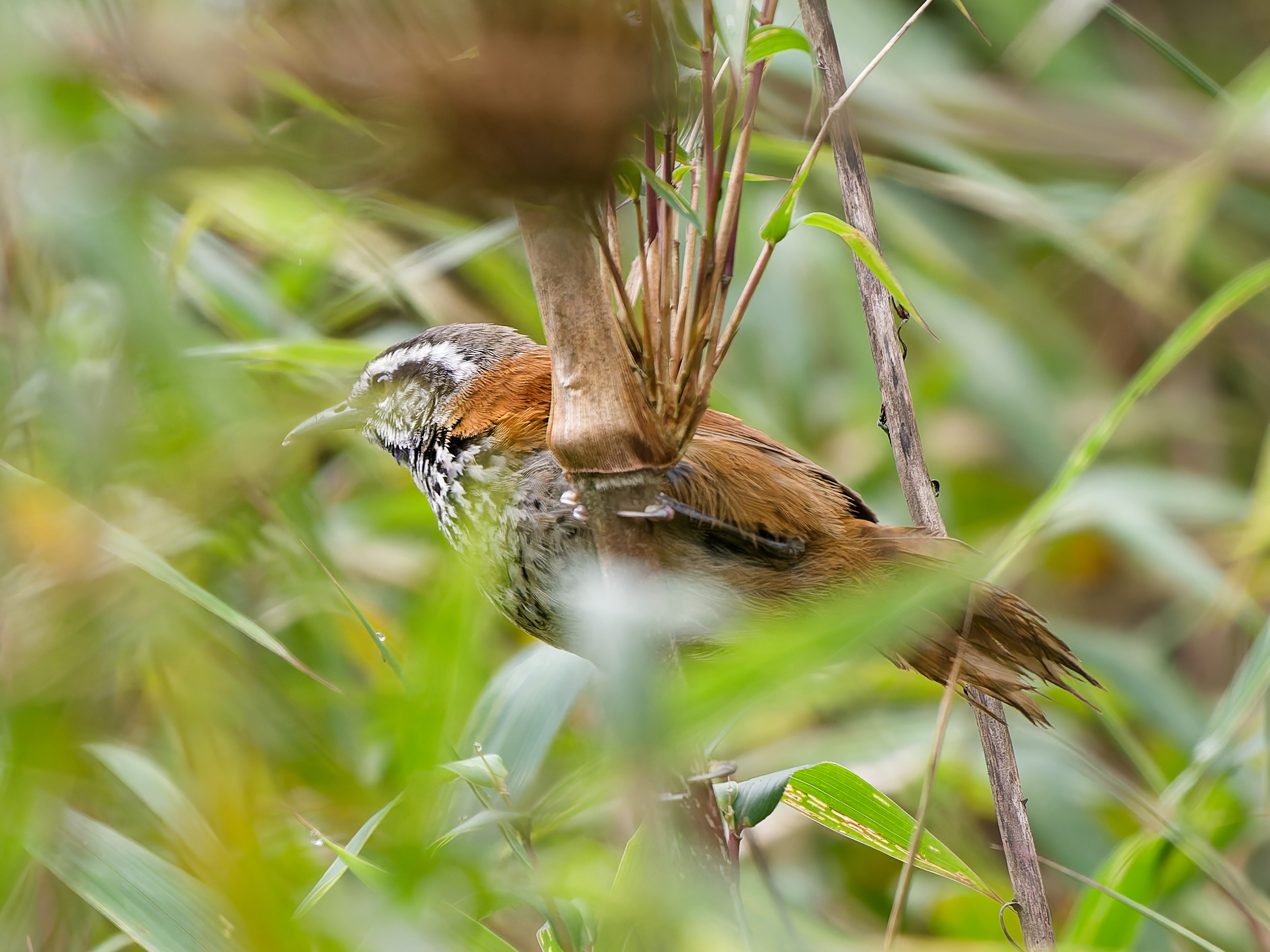

Conservation status
- Least Concern (IUCN 3.1)

Scientific classification
- Domain: Eukaryota
- Kingdom: Animalia
- Phylum: Chordata
- Class: Aves
- Order: Passeriformes
- Family: Troglodytidae
- Genus: Pheugopedius
- Species: P. eisenmanni

Binomial name
- Pheugopedius eisenmanni (Parker & O'Neill, 1985)

Synonyms
- Thryothorus eisenmanni

= Inca wren =

Species of bird

The Inca wren (Pheugopedius eisenmanni) is a species of bird in the family Troglodytidae. It is endemic to Peru.

== Taxonomy and systematics ==
The Inca wren is monotypic.

Curiously, this species was not detected by professionals until the 1960s and not described until 1985, though it is regularly encountered at Machu Picchu.

== Description ==
The Inca wren is 14.5 to 15.5 cm (5.7 to 6.1 in) long; males weigh 22.0 to 27.0 g (0.78 to 0.95 oz) and females 19.0 to 23.0 g (0.67 to 0.81 oz). The adult male has a dull black crown and nape, a broad white supercilium, and a black and white streaked face. Its shoulders, back, and rump are bright russet and the tail is russet with dusky bars. Its throat is white and the breast and belly are white with bold black streaks. Its flanks are dull yellowish brown. The adult female's crown is charcoal gray, its underparts' streaking is only on the breast, and the tail is less barred than the male's. The juvenile is duller overall, with a brown crown and unstreaked light grayish brown underparts.

== Distribution and habitat ==
The Inca wren is found only in a small area of Peru's Department of Cuzco, on the east side of the Andes at elevations between 1,700 and 3,350 m (5,580 and 10,990 ft). It inhabits the under and middle stories of humid montane forest and its edges. It especially favors dense stands of Chusquea bamboo.

== Behavior ==
=== Feeding ===
The Inca wren is known to be insectivorous though details of its diet have been little reported. It forages near the ground in bamboo and other dense foliage, usually in pairs but also in groups of up to six individuals. It seldom joins mixed-species foraging flocks.

=== Breeding ===
Almost nothing is known about the Inca wren's breeding phenology. Fledglings have been observed in May.

=== Vocalization ===
Male and female Inca wrens sing duets, "a rich, varied, warbled series of whistled phrases" . One call is "a rich tchp or tchp-er, sometimes in chattered series".

== Status ==
The IUCN has assessed the Inca wren as being of Least Concern. Though it has a small range, its population is believed to be increasing. "Given that this species occupies disturbed habitats, it may even benefit, locally, from human activities, such as a low level of clearing for subsistence agriculture and road construction."
