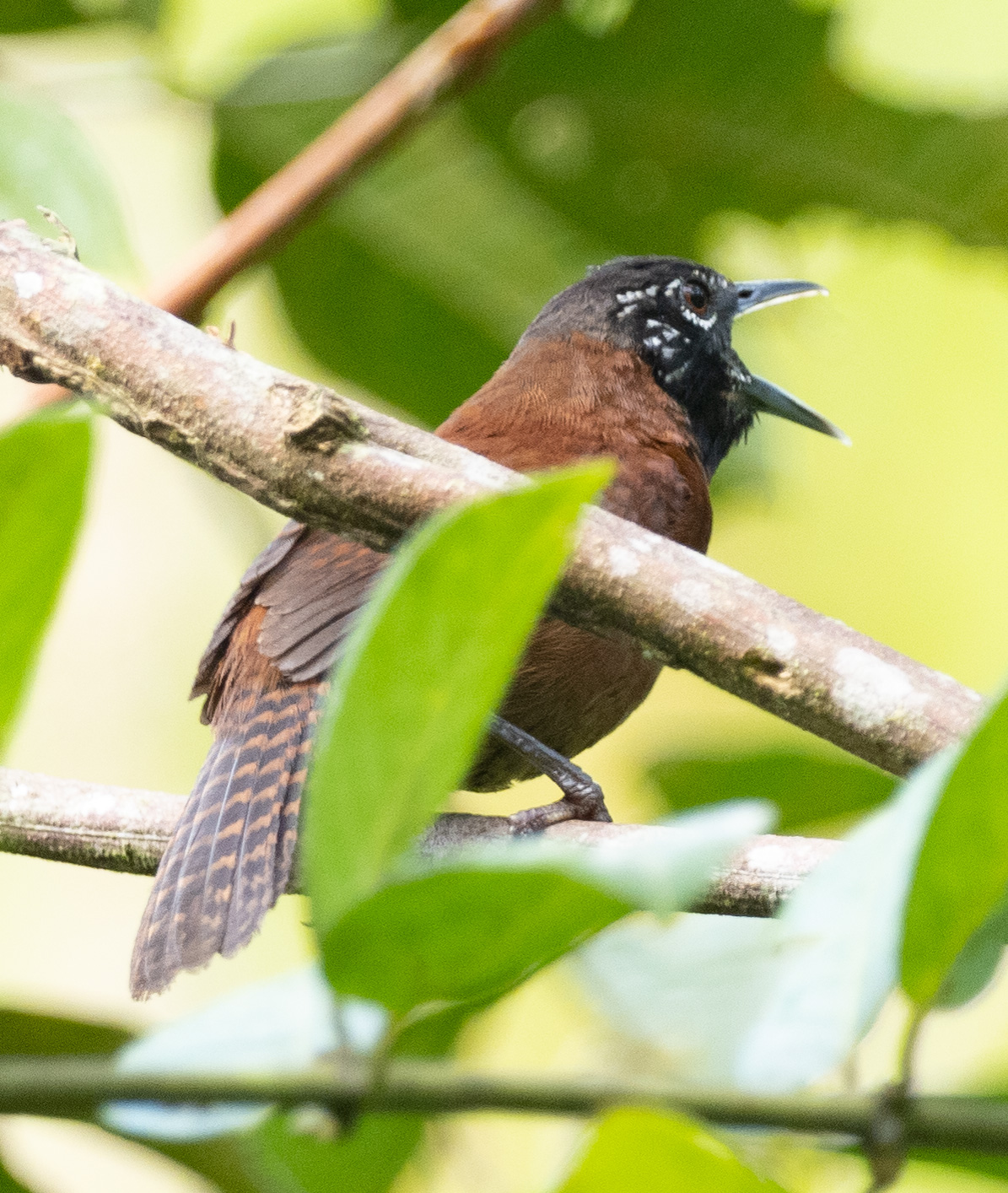
- Sooty-headed wren at Montezuma Reserve, Colombia

Conservation status
- Least Concern (IUCN 3.1)

Scientific classification
- Kingdom: Animalia
- Phylum: Chordata
- Class: Aves
- Order: Passeriformes
- Family: Troglodytidae
- Genus: Pheugopedius
- Species: P. spadix

Binomial name
- Pheugopedius spadix Bangs, 1910

Synonyms
- Thryothorus spadix

= Sooty-headed wren =

Species of bird

The sooty-headed wren (Pheugopedius spadix) is a species of bird in the family Troglodytidae. It is found in Colombia and Panama.

== Taxonomy and systematics ==
The sooty-headed wren was previously treated as conspecific with the black-throated wren (Pheugopedius atrogularis) but significant differences in their plumage, song, and ranges demanded their separation.

According to the International Ornithological Committee (IOC) the sooty-headed wren is monotypic. However, the Clements taxonomy, BirdLife International (BLI), and the Cornell Lab of Ornithology's Birds of the World recognize two subspecies, the nominate Pheugopedius spadix spadix and P. s. xerampelinus.

== Description ==
The sooty-headed wren is 14.5 cm (5.7 in) long. The nominate adults' crown, shoulders, and back are dull blackish and the rump bright chestnut. Their tail is chestnut with bold black bars. Much of their face is black with white streaks. Their chin and throat are black and contrast with the bright chestnut lower throat and chest. The belly is a duller grayish brown between reddish brown flanks. The juvenile is duller than the adult and has less contrast between the areas of different color. P. s. xerampelinus is overall paler than the nominate and has less extensive reddish brown on the flanks.

== Distribution and habitat ==
The nominate sooty-headed wren is found in Colombia, in the Pacific lowlands from southern Chocó Department to Nariño Department and east from there into the central Magdalena Valley and some isolated mountain ranges. P. s. xerampelinus is found on the Pacific slope of far southern Panama's Darién Province. The species inhabits the interior and edges of humid forest, cloudforest, and dense secondary forest. It favors areas with heavy moss growth. In elevation it mostly ranges between 800 and 1,800 m (2,600 and 5,900 ft) but can be found as low as 400 m (1,300 ft) in Colombia.

== Behavior ==
=== Feeding ===
The sooty-headed wren usually forages in pairs, staying low in the vegetation, and seldom joins mixed-species foraging flocks. It has been observed following army ant swarms. Its prey is mostly or entirely invertebrates including spiders and adult and larval insects.

=== Breeding ===
Though little information has been published about the sooty-headed wren's breeding phenology, it appears to have a breeding season spanning from March to December. Its nest is a ball made of coarse material and leaves with a side entrance.

=== Vocalization ===
Both sexes of the sooty-headed wren sing, "a series of...gurgling whistles" .

== Status ==
The IUCN has assessed the sooty-headed wren as being of Least Concern. It is "[f]airly common in suitable habitat in Colombia."
