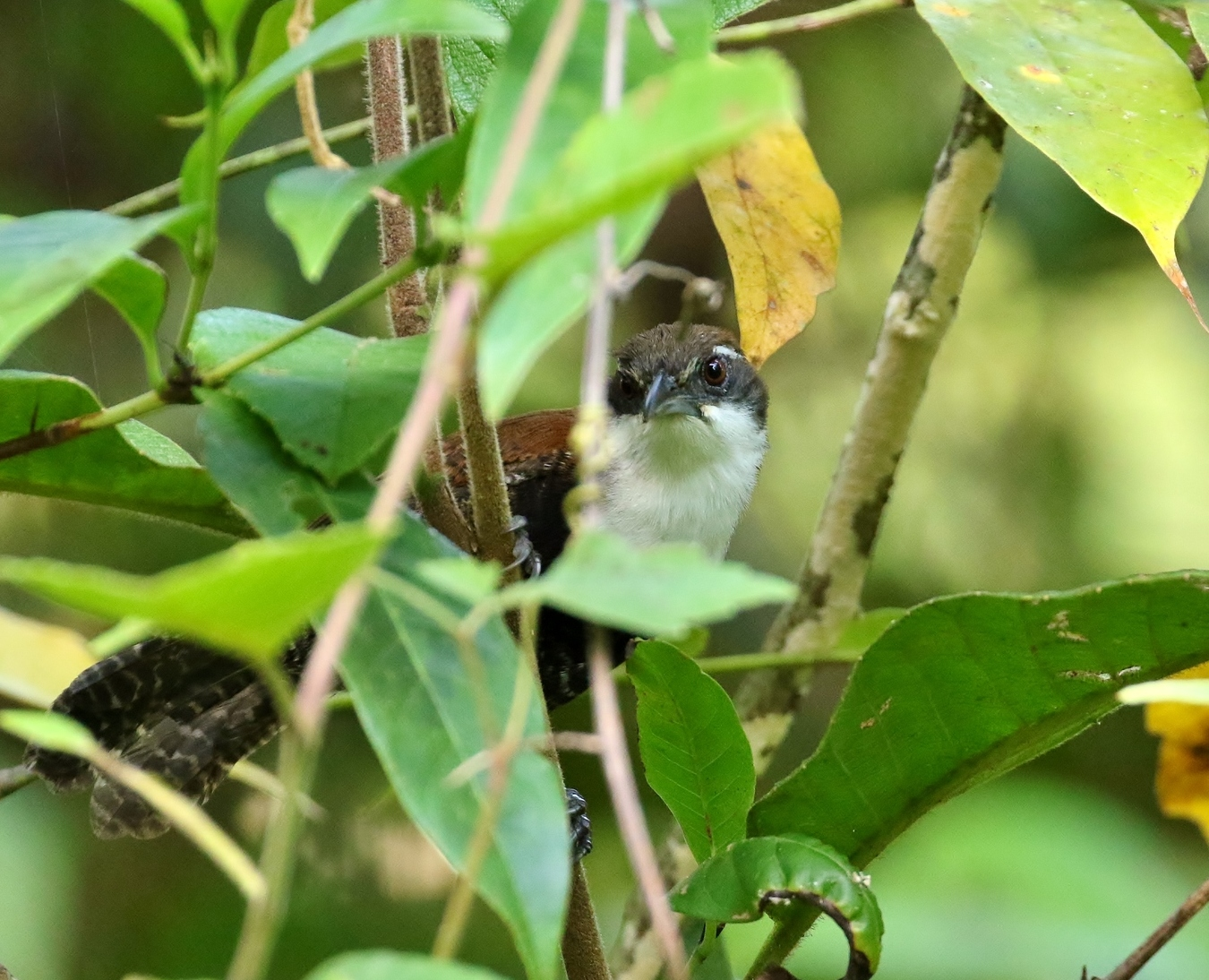

Conservation status
- Least Concern (IUCN 3.1)

Scientific classification
- Kingdom: Animalia
- Phylum: Chordata
- Class: Aves
- Order: Passeriformes
- Family: Troglodytidae
- Genus: Pheugopedius
- Species: P. fasciatoventris

Binomial name
- Pheugopedius fasciatoventris (Lafresnaye, 1845)

Synonyms
- Thryothorus fasciativentris; Thryothorus melanogaster

= Black-bellied wren =

Species of bird

The black-bellied wren (Pheugopedius fasciatoventris) is a species of bird in the family Troglodytidae. It is found in Colombia, Costa Rica, and Panama.

== Taxonomy and systematics ==
The black-bellied wren has three subspecies, the nominate Pheugopedius fasciatoventris fasciatoventris, P. f. melanogaster, and P. f. albigularis.

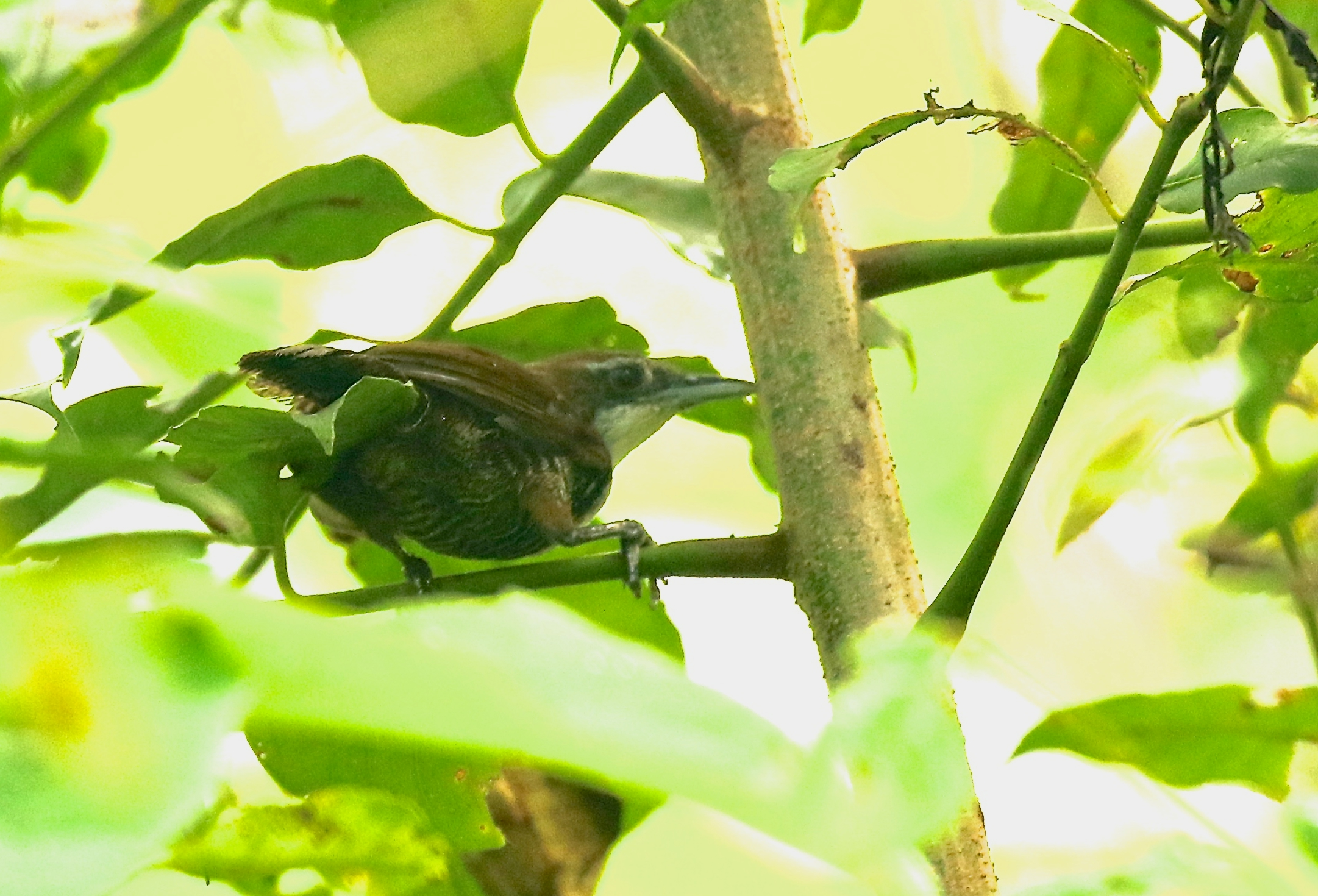
Aligande area - Darien, Panama

== Description ==
Male black-bellied wrens weigh 23.5 to 34.5 g (0.83 to 1.22 oz) and females 19.5 to 28.5 g (0.69 to 1.01 oz). Adults of all three subspecies have a rich chestnut back and tail; the latter has black bars. They have a white supercilium of varying size above a grayish face and are white on the chin, throat, and breast. All three have a black belly, but that of P. f. melanogaster is unmarked while those of the other two subspecies have thin white bars.

== Distribution and habitat ==
P. f. melanogaster is the northernmost subspecies; it is found from the Gulf of Nicoya in western Costa Rica through western Panama to the Canal Zone. P. f. albigularis is found from the Canal Zone into Colombia's Chocó Department. The nominate P. f. fasciatoventris is found in northwestern and central Colombia east to the foothills of the Sierra Nevada de Santa Marta and south into the Cauca and Magdalena valleys. The species inhabits the interior and edges of primary and secondary forest and is often associated with streams.

== Behavior ==
=== Feeding ===
The black-bellied wren forages mainly in the canopy and sub-canopy of both the forest interior and its edges. It also sometimes forages in the understory and on the ground, but always in dense cover. It preys on small arthropods but details are scant.

=== Breeding ===
The black-bellied wren nests mostly in forest edges, usually near the ground in vine tangles. The nests are domed with a side entrance and constructed by both sexes of strips of palm and sugar cane leaves and lined with softer plant material. The clutch size is two. It appears that only the female incubates the eggs. The species' nests are heavily predated.

=== Vocalization ===
Both sexes of the black-bellied wren have large song repertoires; one male was recorded with 38 different songs and a female with 19. Multiple examples are available at Xeno-canto and Cornell's Macaulay Library .

== Status ==
The IUCN has assessed the black-bellied wren as being of Least Concern. However, its population "is suspected to be in decline owing to ongoing habitat destruction and fragmentation."
