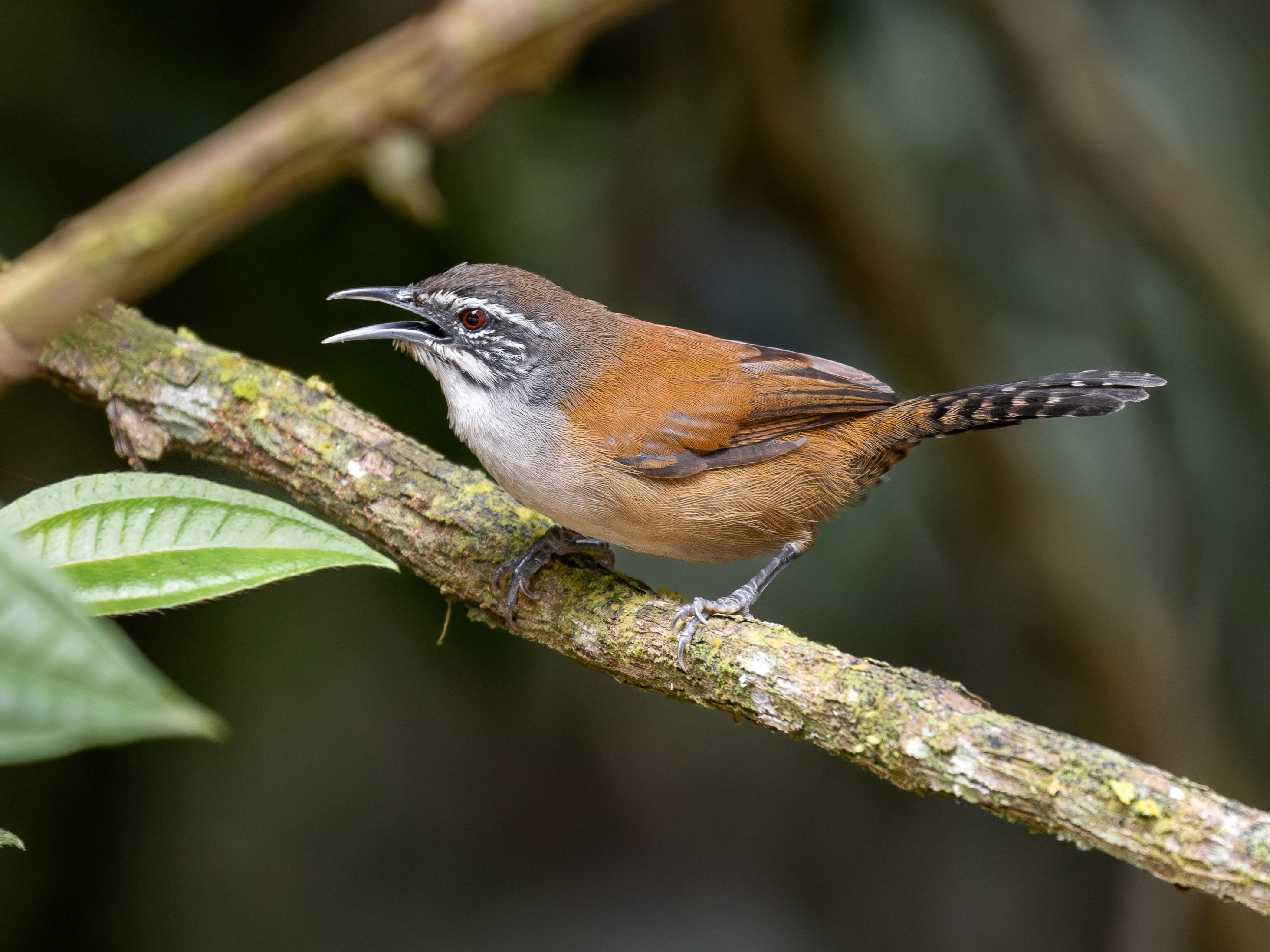

Conservation status
- Least Concern (IUCN 3.1)

Scientific classification
- Kingdom: Animalia
- Phylum: Chordata
- Class: Aves
- Order: Passeriformes
- Family: Troglodytidae
- Genus: Pheugopedius
- Species: P. genibarbis

Binomial name
- Pheugopedius genibarbis (Swainson, 1838)

Synonyms
- Thryothorus genibarbis

= Moustached wren =

Species of bird

The moustached wren (Pheugopedius genibarbis) is a species of bird in the family Troglodytidae. It is found in Bolivia, Brazil, and Peru.

== Taxonomy and systematics ==
The moustached wren was at one time treated as conspecific with the whiskered wren (Pheugopedius mystaclais). It has four subspecies:

- P. g. juruanus Ihering (1905)
- P. g. genibarbis Swainson (1837)
- P. g. intercedens Hellmayr (1908)
- P. g. bolivianus Todd (1913)

== Description ==
The moustached wren is 15.5 cm (6.1 in) long and weighs 16.2 to 22.8 g (0.57 to 0.80 oz). The nominate adult has an olivaceous gray-brown crown and nape, bright chestnut back and rump, and a dull brown tail with narrow blackish bars. It has a white supercilium and eyering, a black stripe through the eye, gray-black cheeks streaked with white, a white moustachial stripe, and a black malar stripe. Its throat and upper chest are white, its lower chest buffy, and its flanks and belly deeper brown. Compared to the adult, the juvenile's crown is browner, its back duller and less deeply chestnut, and it has less well defined facial markings and more diffuse bars on the tail.

P. g. juruanus is larger than the nominate and its underparts are paler. P. g. intercedens' crown is less sooty and its underparts are duller than the nominate's. P. g. bolivianus is similar to intercedens but its underparts are a deeper ochre compared to the nominate's buff and it has more gray on the face.

== Distribution and habitat ==
The moustached wren is found throughout the central and southern Amazon Basin. The subspecies are distributed thus:

- P. g. juruanus, eastern Brazil from the Madeira River east to the Atlantic coast
- P. g. genibarbis, the upper Amazon River drainage in eastern Peru, western Brazil as far east as the Madeira River, and probably northern and western Bolivia
- P. g. intercedens, central Brazil's Mato Grosso and Goiás states
- P. g. bolivianus, northern Santa Cruz Department of eastern Bolivia

It inhabits forest edge, including along rivers, and favors dense stands of Bambusa bamboo. In elevation it ranges as high as 1,500 m (4,900 ft) in Bolivia but generally only from sea level to middle elevations.

== Behavior ==
=== Feeding ===
The moustached wren forages low in vegetation and often in pairs. Though its diet has not been documented, it is probably mostly or entirely invertebrates.

=== Breeding ===
Four nests of the moustached wren found in Peru's Manu National Park were domed or ball-like with a side entrance. They were all found with four eggs, in September and October. One adult incubated the eggs; it was assumed to be the female. Nothing else is known about the species' breeding phenology.

=== Vocalization ===
Both sexes of moustached wren sing "a series of fast rollicking phrases" . Their call is "a whining 'jeeyr'" .

== Status ==
The IUCN has assessed the moustached wren as being of Least Concern. It is fairly common over its large range, its habitat is widespread and not excessively threatened, and it occurs in several protected areas.
