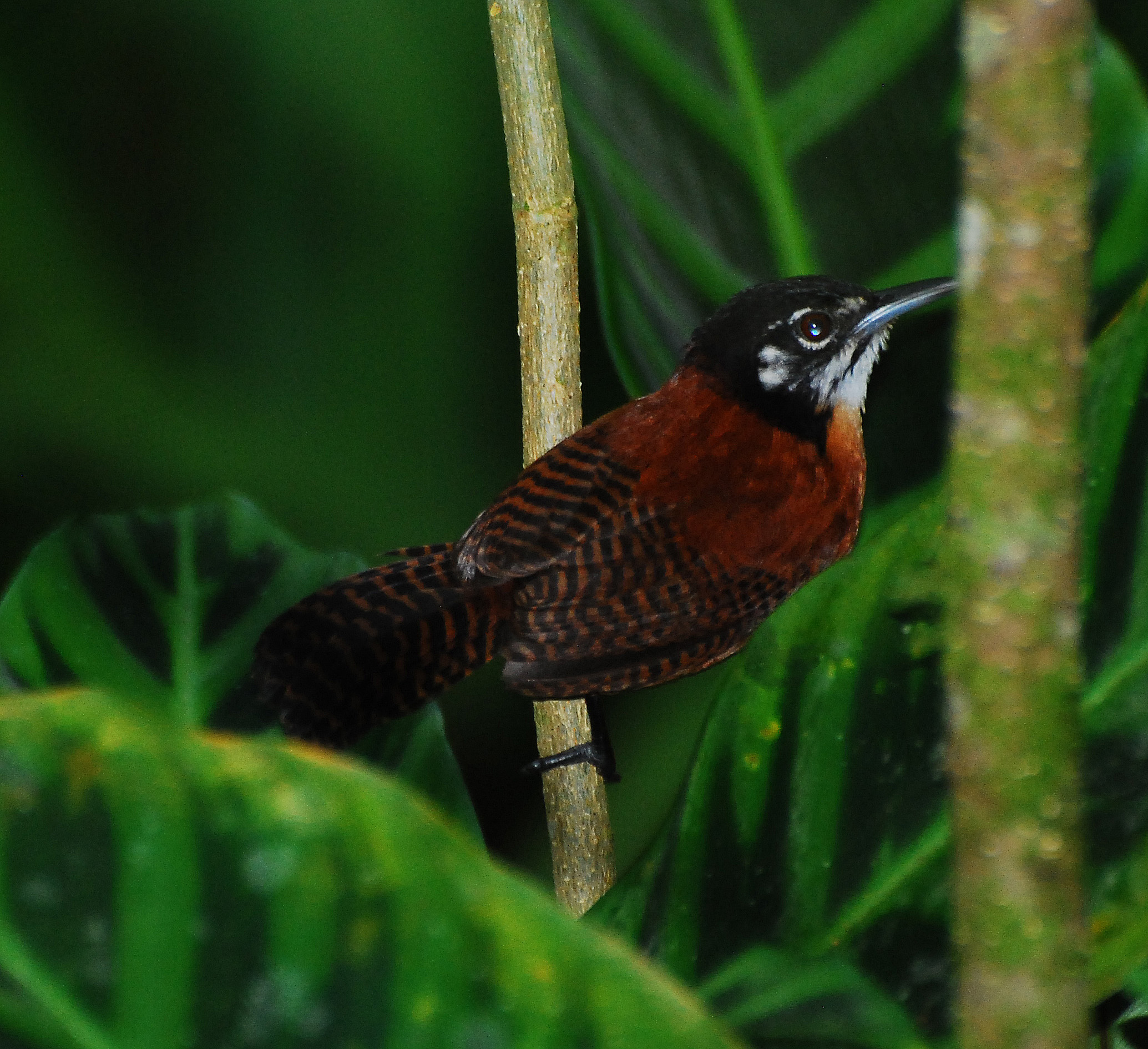
- In Costa Rica

Conservation status
- Least Concern (IUCN 3.1)

Scientific classification
- Kingdom: Animalia
- Phylum: Chordata
- Class: Aves
- Order: Passeriformes
- Family: Troglodytidae
- Genus: Cantorchilus
- Species: C. nigricapillus

Binomial name
- Cantorchilus nigricapillus (PL Sclater, 1860)

Synonyms
- Thryothorus nigricapillus

= Bay wren =

Species of bird

The bay wren (Cantorchilus nigricapillus) is a species of bird in the family Troglodytidae. It is native to southern Central America and northwestern South America.

== Taxonomy and systematics ==
The bay wren has sometimes been treated as conspecific with the riverside wren (Cantorchilus semibadius) but their plumages are quite different as are DNA analyses. Some authors consider the two of them a superspecies but others deny that close relationship.

The bay wren has seven subspecies:

- C. n. costaricensis Sharpe (1882)
- C. n. castaneus Lawrence (1861)
- C. n. odicus Wetmore (1959)
- C. n. reditus Griscom (1932)
- C. n. schottii Baird (1864)
- C. n. connectens Chapman (1912)
- C. n. nigricapillus Sclater (1860)

The Clements taxonomy combines the first five as the "Central American" group and the last two as the "South American" group. Other authors include schottii in the South American group.

== Description ==
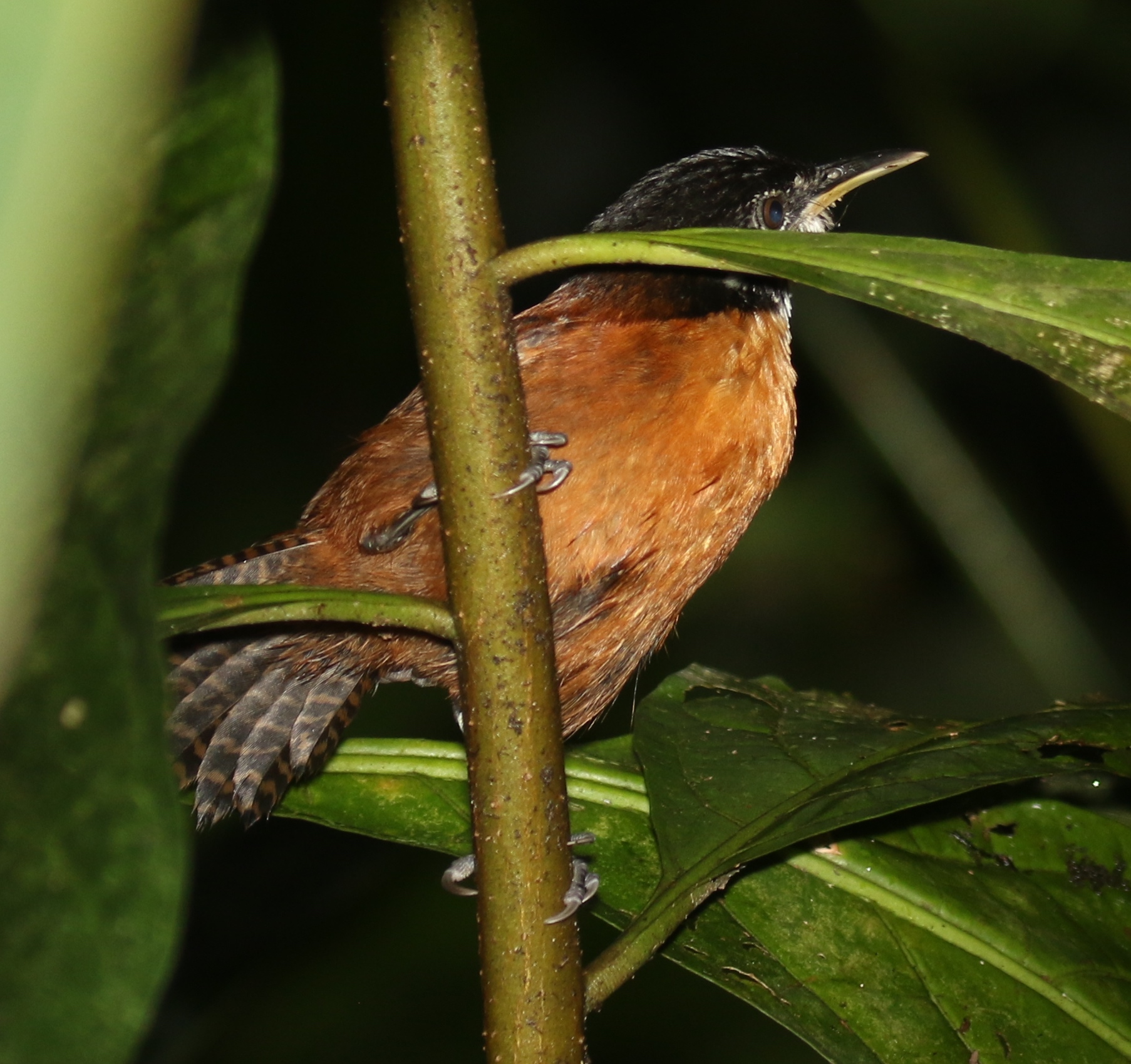
Bay wren (flash photo) at Selva Verde Lodge - Costa Rica

The bay wren is 12.6 to 15.6 cm (5.0 to 6.1 in) long. Eight specimens from Panama weighed 17.7 to 26.3 g (0.62 to 0.93 oz). Adults of the nominate subspecies have a black face with a narrow white supercilium, a partial eyering, and a white patch at the back of the cheek. Their crown and nape are black and the rest of the upperparts are rich chestnut. The tail is a rich brown with bold black bars. The throat and breast are white, transitioning to rufous brown on the lower belly and flanks. Black bars cross the underparts from the breast to the vent area. Juveniles have essentially the same pattern but are paler and with less well defined markings. The other subspecies vary from the nominate in the extent and intensity of some colors and the thickness and amount of barring.

== Distribution and habitat ==
The bay wren's range spans from Nicauagua to Ecuador. The subspecies are found thus:

- C. n. costaricensis, from northeastern Nicaragua through Caribbean Costa Rica into western Panama
- C. n. castaneus, from west-central Panama's Veraguas Province to the Canal Zone
- C. n. odicus, Isla Escudo de Veraguas off the Caribbean coast of western Panama
- C. n. reditus, the Caribbean slope of eastern Panama
- C. n. schottii, from eastern Panama's Darién Province into Antioquia and Chocó Departments of northwestern Colombia
- C. n. connectens from Cauca and Nariño Departments in southwestern Colombia into Esmeraldas Province in far northern Ecuador
- C. n. nigricapillus western Ecuador from Esmeraldas south to El Oro Province

The bay wren is closely tied to water over most of its range, though in Nicaragua the habitat is drier. It inhabits dense, fairly low, vegetation such as thickets along watercourses, overgrown clearings, roadsides, and the understory of secondary forest. It will occur in forest interiors if the undergrowth is sufficient.

== Behavior ==
=== Feeding ===
The bay wren's diet appears to be entirely invertebrates. They forage by gleaning from foliage and branches and by probing hanging vegetation and tangles of vines.

=== Breeding ===
The bay wren's breeding season is between March and October in Costa Rica, between March and November in Panama, and spans January to August in Colombia. Most of the nests that have been described were "elbow-shaped" with an entrance tube, though some were more round. They were made by both sexes from plant stems, grass, and other vegetable materials and lined with finer fibers. The clutch size is usually two or three.

=== Vocalization ===
The bay wren's song is loud, "a rapid repetition of clear, rich-toned, slurred, ringing whistles, trills, and warbles" sometimes given antiphonally. The species has a number of calls.

== Status ==
The IUCN has assessed the bay wren as being of Least Concern. It seems to tolerate and possibly benefit from some forms of habitat modification caused by human activities, barring the complete destruction or conversion of suitable habitat. However, further study is required, and research into aspects of the species' demography in different habitats would also be of value.
