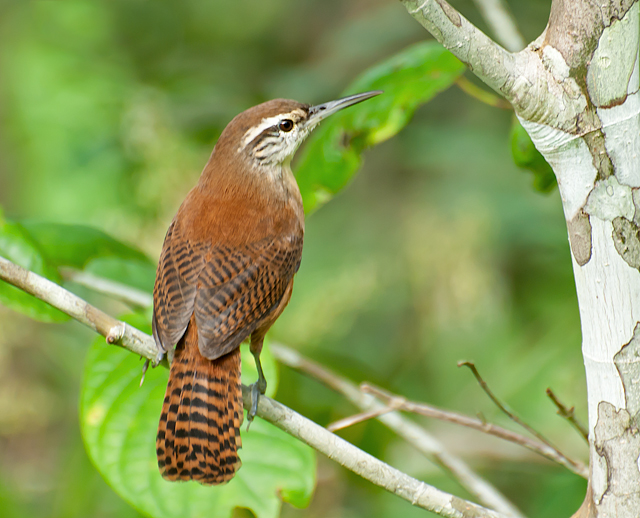
- In Registro, São Paulo, Brazil

Conservation status
- Least Concern (IUCN 3.1)

Scientific classification
- Kingdom: Animalia
- Phylum: Chordata
- Class: Aves
- Order: Passeriformes
- Family: Troglodytidae
- Genus: Cantorchilus
- Species: C. longirostris

Binomial name
- Cantorchilus longirostris (Vieillot, 1819)

Synonyms
- Thryothorus longirostris

= Long-billed wren =

Species of bird in Brazil

The long-billed wren (Cantorchilus longirostris) is a species of bird in the family Troglodytidae. It is endemic to Brazil.

== Taxonomy and systematics ==
The long-billed wren has been treated as being conspecific with the buff-breasted wren (Cantorchilus leucotis). It has two subspecies, the nominate C. l. longirostris and C. l. bahiae. The latter has been suggested for elevation to species status.

== Description ==
The long-billed wren is 19 to 21.5 cm (7.5 to 8.5 in) long and weighs 20 to 21 g (0.71 to 0.74 oz). The crown and nape of adults of the nominate subspecies are rich dark brown that becomes progressively more reddish to the rump; the lower back has obscure bars. Their tail is reddish brown with darker bars. They have an off-white supercilium, a darkish brown eyestripe, cheeks mottled off-white and dark gray, and a blackish malar stripe. Their throat color ranges from whitish to pale buff; their chest is reddish buff and the belly a deep rich buff. Juveniles are almost the same but their facial markings are not as distinct. C. l. bahiae is paler overall than the nominate, with the underparts' colors being much less saturated.

== Distribution and habitat ==
C. l. bahiae is the more northerly subspecies of long-billed wren; it is found in the "bulge" of eastern Brazil from Piauí south to Minas Gerais and east to the Atlantic coast. C. l. longirostris is found in a narrower coastal band from Bahia south to eastern Santa Catarina. The species inhabits secondary forest, the edges and shrubby clearings of primary forest, mangroves, caatinga, and restinga. In elevation it ranges from sea level to 900 m (3,000 ft).

== Behavior ==
=== Feeding ===
The long-billed wren's diet has not been studied, and its foraging habits are not well known. It probably forages singly or in pairs, usually within 2 m (6.6 ft) of the ground but sometimes as high as 5 m (16 ft).

=== Breeding ===
The long-billed wren's breeding season appears to coincide with its ranges' rainy season. Its breeding nest is a dome with a downward facing entrance tube; the species also builds "dormitory" nests for roosting.

=== Vocalization ===
Both sexes of the long-billed wren sing, sometimes alone and sometimes in duet. The songs are "loud and varied".

== Status ==
The IUCN has assessed the long-billed wren as being of Least Concern. It is "frequently abundant" and found in several protected areas.
