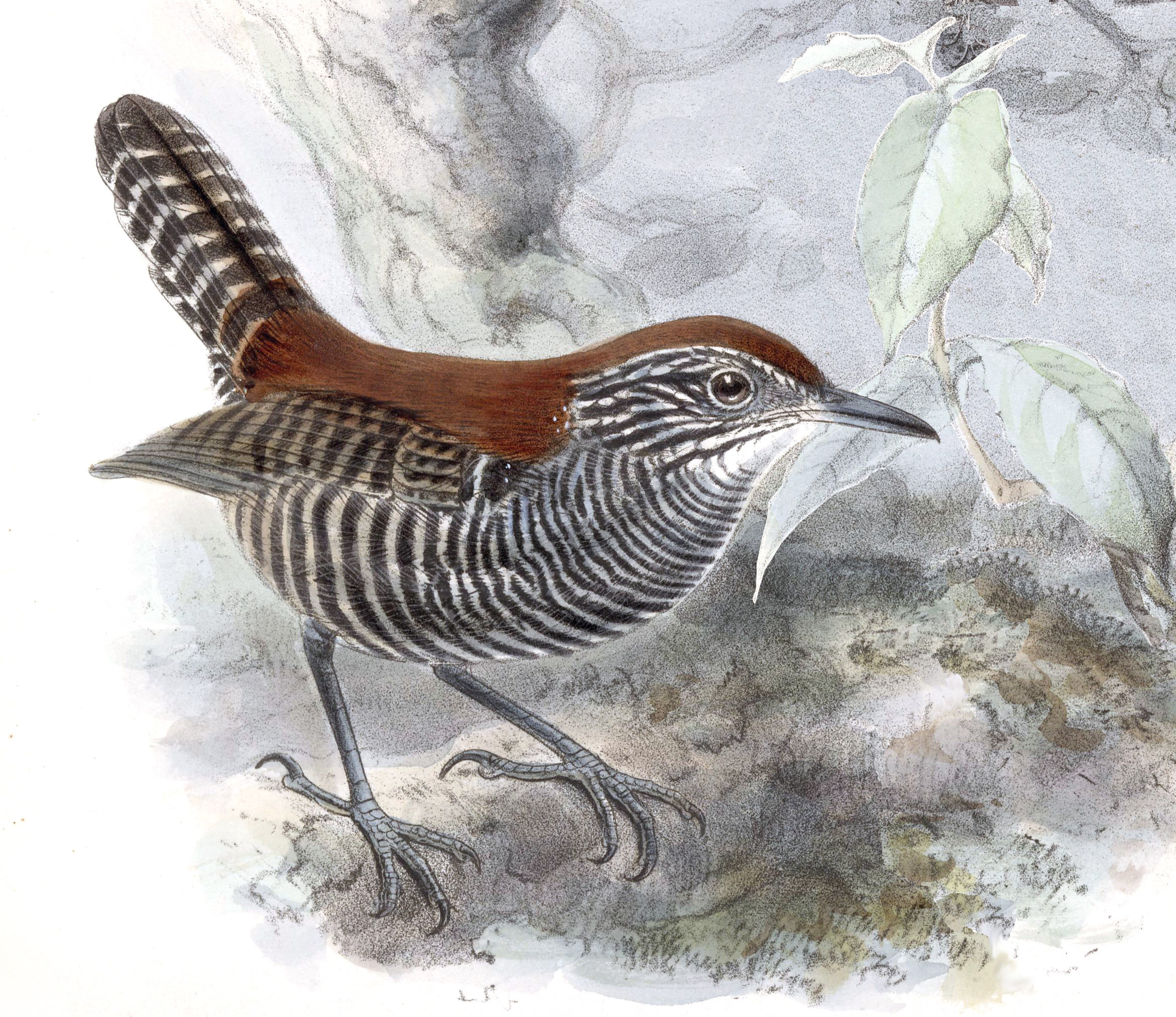
- Riverside wren (Cantorchilus semibadius)

Scientific classification
- Kingdom: Animalia
- Phylum: Chordata
- Class: Aves
- Order: Passeriformes
- Family: Troglodytidae
- Genus: Cantorchilus; Mann, Barker, Graves, Dingess-Mann & Slater 2006

Type species
- Thryothorus longirostris Vieillot, 1819

Species
- see text

= Cantorchilus =

Genus of birds

Cantorchilus is a genus of birds in the wren family Troglodytidae. The genus was introduced in 2006 and contains twelve species.

== Taxonomy ==
The genus Cantorchilus was introduced in 2006 by Nigel Mann and coworkers with the type species as Thryothorus longirostris Vieillot, 1819, the long-billed wren. The genus name combines the Latin cantus meaning "song" with the Ancient Greek ορχιλος/orkhilos meaning "wren".

== Species ==
The genus contain the following 12 species:

Image	Scientific name	Common name	Distribution
	Cantorchilus modestus	Cabanis's wren	
	Cantorchilus zeledoni	Canebrake wren	
	Cantorchilus elutus	Isthmian wren	
	Cantorchilus leucotis	Buff-breasted wren	northern half of South America
	Cantorchilus superciliaris	Superciliated wren	western Ecuador, northwestern Peru
	Cantorchilus guarayanus	Fawn-breasted wren	northern Bolivia, southwestern Brazil
	Cantorchilus longirostris	Long-billed wren	Caatinga, Atlantic Forest
	Cantorchilus griseus	Grey wren	western Amazonia
	Cantorchilus semibadius	Riverside wren	
	Cantorchilus nigricapillus	Bay wren	
	Cantorchilus thoracicus	Stripe-breasted wren	
	Cantorchilus leucopogon	Stripe-throated wren	
