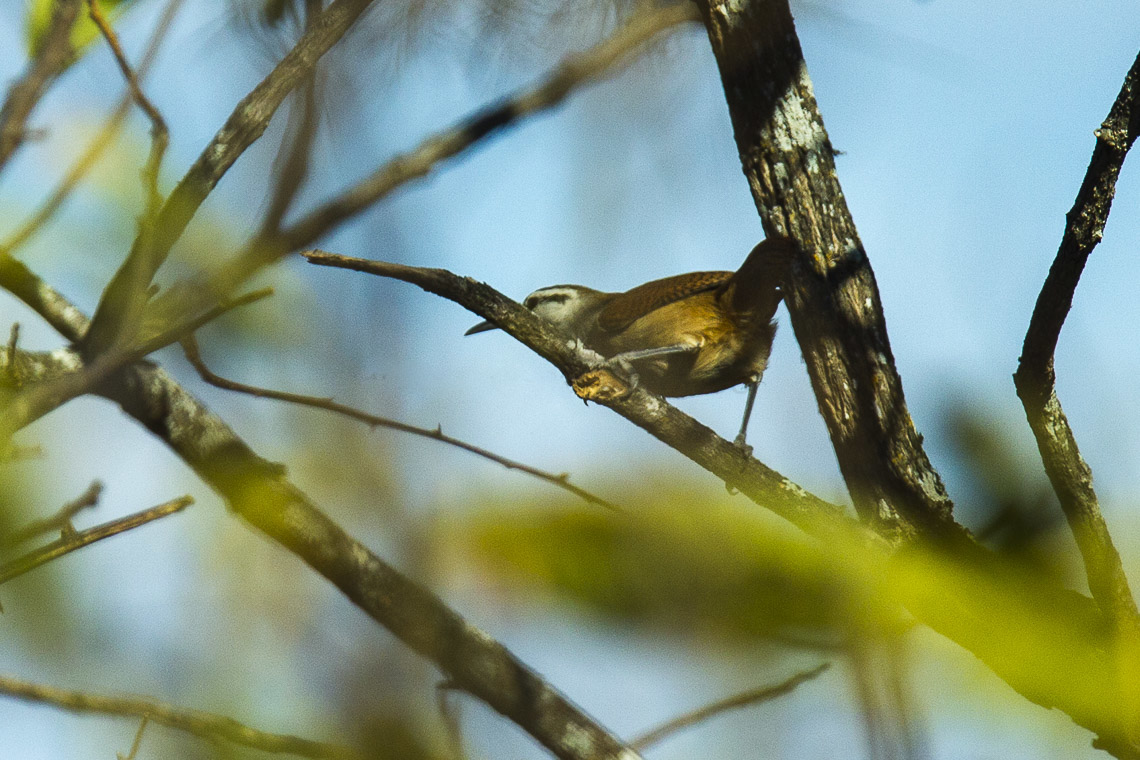

Conservation status
- Least Concern (IUCN 3.1)

Scientific classification
- Kingdom: Animalia
- Phylum: Chordata
- Class: Aves
- Order: Passeriformes
- Family: Troglodytidae
- Genus: Cantorchilus
- Species: C. superciliaris

Binomial name
- Cantorchilus superciliaris (Lawrence, 1869)

Synonyms
- Thryothorus superciliaris

= Superciliated wren =

Species of bird

The superciliated wren (Cantorchilus superciliaris) is a species of bird in the family Troglodytidae. It is found in Ecuador and Peru.

== Taxonomy and systematics ==
The superciliated wren has sometimes been treated as conspecific with the buff-breasted wren (C. leucotis) but they differ in vocalizations and ecology. It has two subspecies, the nominate C. s. superciliaris and C. s. baroni.

== Description ==
The superciliated wren is 14.5 cm (5.7 in) long. Adults of the nominate subspecies have a dark grayish brown crown, rufous-brown shoulders and back becoming redder on the rump. The tail is reddish brown with black bars. They have a prominent white supercilium, a dark brown stripe through the eye, and buffy-white cheeks. Their chin and throat are pale buffy white that darkens to the lower chest and the flanks are buffy gray. Juveniles are similar but a cooler brown in the uppersides. C. s. baroni has a more tawny lower back and rump.

== Distribution and habitat ==
The nominate superciliated wren is found in western Ecuador from Manabí Province south to Guayas Province. C. s. baroni is found from southern Ecuador's El Oro and Loja Provinces south to the departments of Ancash and Lima in west central Peru. The species primarily inhabits dry woodland, scrub, and brushland though it is also found in more humid woodland. In elevation it mostly ranges from sea level to 1,500 m (4,920 ft) but can be found as high as 1,850 m (6,070 ft).

== Behavior ==
=== Feeding ===
The superciliated wren forages in vegetation on and near the ground, usually in pairs. Its primary food appears to be insects.

=== Breeding ===
The superciliated wren's breeding period is not well known; at a minimum it includes January and February in Peru. Its nest is rather flimsy and shaped like a flask. Pairs build several nests but use only one for breeding; it is lined with soft material. Nests are typically placed 1.6 to 3.2 m (5.2 to 10.5 ft) above ground in a bush or tree. Two or three eggs are laid. Nests are frequently parasitized by shiny cowbirds (Molothrus bonariensis).

=== Vocalization ===
Both sexes of the superciliated wren are thought to sing "a series of short repeated phrases of 2 or 3 notes" with sometimes a trill added.

== Status ==
The IUCN has assessed the superciliated wren as being of Least Concern. It is common in at least parts of its range and appears "able to tolerate moderately disturbed habitat."
