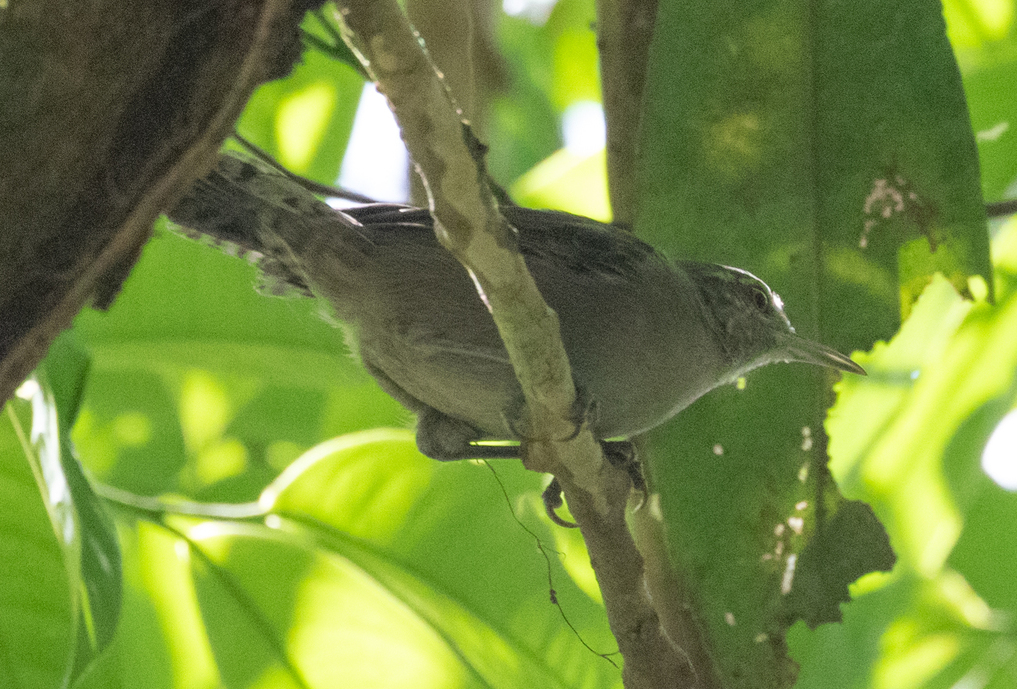

Conservation status
- Least Concern (IUCN 3.1)

Scientific classification
- Kingdom: Animalia
- Phylum: Chordata
- Class: Aves
- Order: Passeriformes
- Family: Troglodytidae
- Genus: Cantorchilus
- Species: C. griseus

Binomial name
- Cantorchilus griseus (Todd, 1925)

Synonyms
- Thryothorus griseus, Odontorchilus olallae

= Grey wren =

Species of bird

The grey wren (Cantorchilus griseus) is a species of bird in the family Troglodytidae. It is endemic to the southwestern part of Amazonas state in Brazil. This small, poorly known wren somewhat resembles a house wren, but its upperparts are gray.

== Taxonomy and systematics ==
The grey wren, with many other Cantorchilus wrens, was originally included in genus Thryothorus, but that genus was determined to be paraphyletic. There are suggestions that the species may warrant its own genus because it is quite different from the rest of genus Cantorchilus.

== Description ==
The grey wren is 11.5 cm (4.5 in) long. The adults have a lead-gray crown and upperparts; the tail is also gray with broad blackish bars. It has a faint whitish supercilium and the rest of the face is gray. The throat is whitish gray, the chest gray, and the belly a slightly buffy gray. It differs from others of its genus in its smaller overall size, its shorter tail, the gray plumage, and the absence of prominent facial markings.

== Distribution and habitat ==
The grey wren is known only from a small area of Brazil, along the right bank of the Rio Javarí and the upper reaches of the Rio Juruá and Rio Purus to the southeast. The Rio Javari forms the border with Peru but the species is unknown on that side (the left bank) of the river. It is a bird of thick vegetation, inhabiting overgrown clearings and the undergrowth of várzea forest. In elevation it ranges only as high as 200 m (660 ft).

== Behavior ==
=== Feeding ===
The grey wren's diet has not been documented. It is known to forage in pairs and small family groups in its habitat's tangled undergrowth.

=== Breeding ===
No information has been published about the grey wren's breeding phenology.

=== Vocalization ===
The grey wren's song is "a repeated phrase of 2 or 3 notes, 'chu-choww' or 'chippit, chippit'".

== Status ==
The IUCN has assessed the grey wren as being of Least Concern. Though it appears to be common in parts of its range, it needs much further study.
