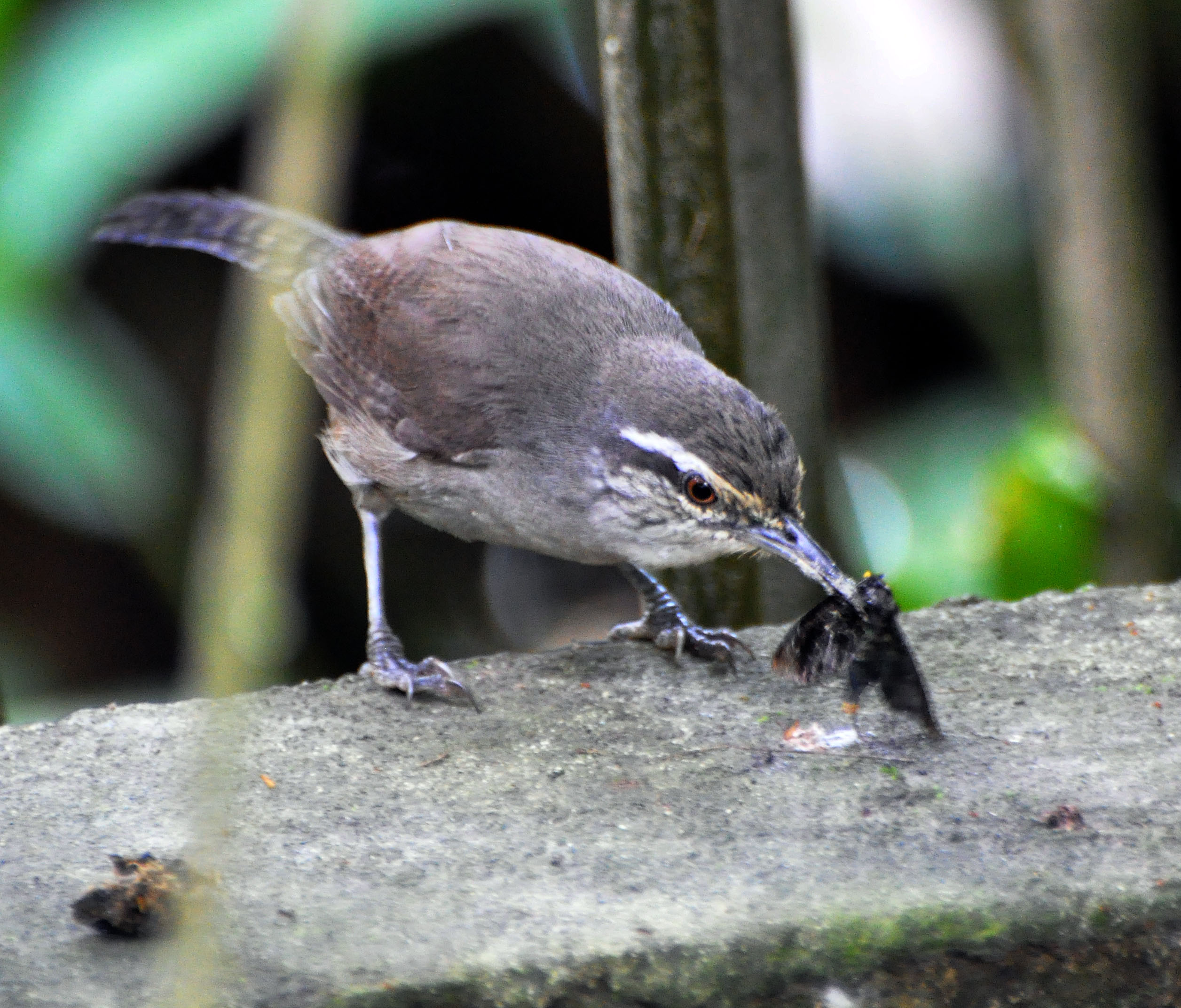

Conservation status
- Least Concern (IUCN 3.1)

Scientific classification
- Kingdom: Animalia
- Phylum: Chordata
- Class: Aves
- Order: Passeriformes
- Family: Troglodytidae
- Genus: Cantorchilus
- Species: C. zeledoni

Binomial name
- Cantorchilus zeledoni (Ridgway, 1878)

= Canebrake wren =

Species of bird

The canebrake wren (Cantorchilus zeledoni) is a species of bird in the family Troglodytidae. It is found in Costa Rica, Nicaragua, and Panama.

== Taxonomy and systematics ==
The canebrake wren, with what are now Cabanis's wren (C. modestus) and the isthmian wren (C. elutus), were called the plain wren. The three were split from each other in 2016 on the basis of a 2015 publication that described their different vocalizations and genetic divergence. The canebrake wren is monotypic.

== Description ==
The canebrake wren is 14 cm (5.5 in) long. Adults' crowns are brown and their upperparts are brownish gray merging to olivaceous gray on the rump. Their tail is olivaceous brown with well defined darker bars. They have a white supercilium, a gray-brown stripe through the eye, and cheeks mottled with gray and off-white. The throat is off white, the chest gray, and the lower belly gray-buff. Juveniles have duller underparts and less well defined facial markings.

== Distribution and habitat ==
The canebrake wren is found from eastern and southeastern Nicaragua through eastern Costa Rica into far northwestern Panama, a zone whose watercourses drain to the Caribbean. It inhabits secondary forest, farmland, and canebrakes but shuns virgin forest. In elevation it ranges from sea level to approximately 600 m (2,000 ft).

== Behavior ==
=== Feeding ===
The canebrake wren forages low down in dense undergrowth but its diet has not been studied.

=== Breeding ===
A study of canebrake wrens in Costa Rica found that their nesting season spanned March to August. The nests were oval balls with a side entrance, built by the female from plant fibers and lined with softer material. They were draped across thin branches in thick vegetation near the ground. Both sexes also built "dormitory" nests for roosting. The clutch size was two or three. Nestlings were fed by both parents. The nests were heavily predated; only two chicks survived from the 20 eggs monitored.

=== Vocalization ===
The members of a canebrake wren pair "sing in complex duet" .

== Status ==
The IUCN has assessed the canebrake wren as being of Least Concern. The species "[s]eems to adapt well to moderately disturbed habitat."

== Additional reading ==
- Garrigues, Richard; Dean, Robert (2007). The Birds of Costa Rica. Ithaca: Zona Tropical/Comstock/Cornell University Press. p. 240. ISBN 978-0-8014-7373-9.
