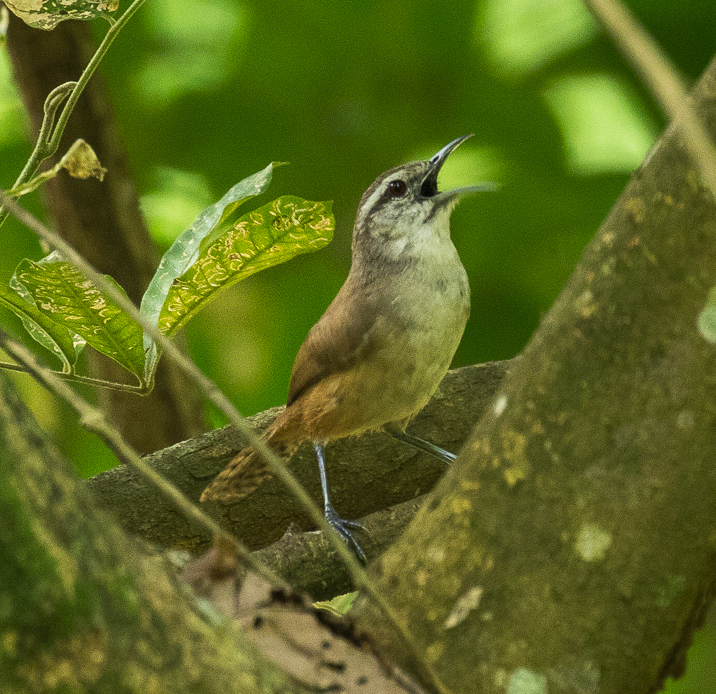

Scientific classification
- Kingdom: Animalia
- Phylum: Chordata
- Class: Aves
- Order: Passeriformes
- Family: Troglodytidae
- Genus: Cantorchilus
- Species: C. elutus

Binomial name
- Cantorchilus elutus (Bangs, 1902)

= Isthmian wren =

Species of bird

The isthmian wren (Cantorchilus elutus) is a species of bird in the family Troglodytidae. It is found in Costa Rica and Panama.

== Taxonomy and systematics ==
The isthmian wren, with what are now Cabanis's wren (C. modestus) and the canebrake wren (C. zeledoni), were called the plain wren. A 2015 publication described their different vocalizations and genetic divergence. In 2016 the International Ornithological Committee (IOC) and the Clements taxonomy accepted the split of plain wren into three species. However, BirdLife International (BLI) retains C. modestus as "plain wren" with elutus as a subspecies of it rather than as a full species.

The isthmian wren is monotypic.

== Description ==
The isthmian wren is 12.5 to 14 cm (4.9 to 5.5 in) long. Adults have a gray-brown crown and back and a pale russet rump. Their tail is russet brown with darker bars. They have a thin white supercilium, a gray-brown stripe through the eye, and cheeks mottled with dark grayish brown and grayish white. The throat is white, the chest pale grayish, and the belly grayish white with buffy cinnamon sides and flanks.

== Distribution and habitat ==
The isthmian wren is found on the Pacific slope of Costa Rica and most of the width of Panama, from Costa Rica's San José Province south and east to just past the Canal Zone. It inhabits humid areas, occurring in a variety of surroundings including forest edges, second growth, and gardens. It shuns dense wet forest. In elevation it ranges from sea level to approximately 2,000 m (6,600 ft).

== Behavior ==
=== Feeding ===
The isthmian wren usually forages in pairs in low dense vegetation, though it occasionally will hunt higher in trees. Its diet has not been well documented but is assumed to be mostly arthropods and other small invertebrates.

=== Breeding ===
The isthmian wren nests from January to September is Costa Rica and is thought to have a similar span in Panama. Its nest is roughly football-shaped with an entrance hole on the side. It is constructed of grass and other vegetable fibers and lined with softer material. It is usually placed within 3 m (9.8 ft) of the ground in dense vegetation. The species also constructs "dormitory" nests for roosting. The female alone incubates the two eggs.

=== Vocalization ===
The isthmian wren's song is "a loud motif of 3–4 clear whistles" frequently sung by both sexes . Its calls include a "harsh 'chur' and a "tinkling 'chi-chi-chi'" .

== Status ==
The IUCN has not assessed the Isthmian wren. "Despite small range, is unlikely to be considered globally threatened" because it is common in much of its range and adapts well to human-modified habitat.

== Additional reading ==
Garrigues, Richard; Dean, Robert (2007). The Birds of Costa Rica. Ithaca: Zona Tropical/Comstock/Cornell University Press. p. 240. ISBN 978-0-8014-7373-9.
