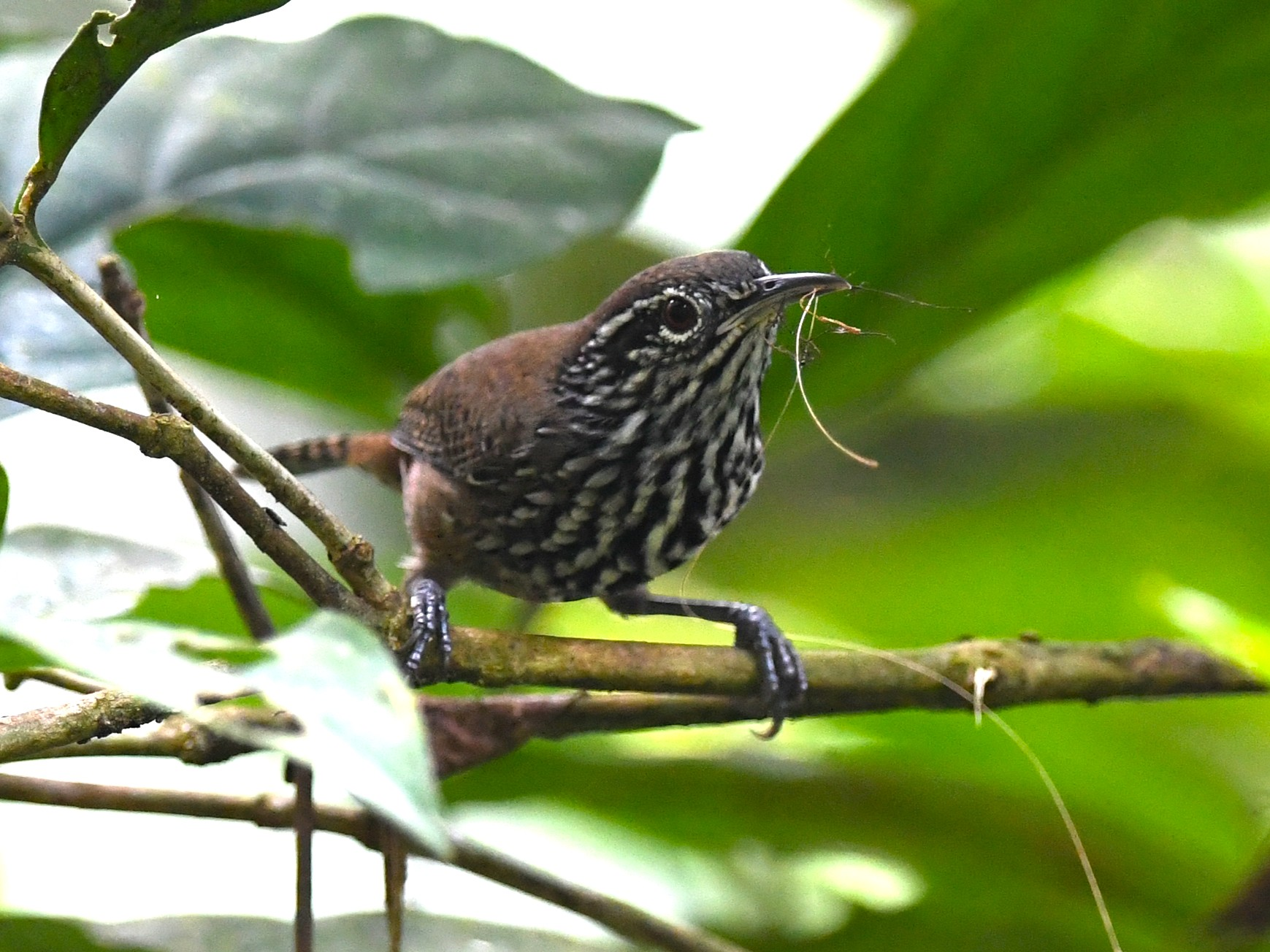
- In Costa Rica

Conservation status
- Least Concern (IUCN 3.1)

Scientific classification
- Kingdom: Animalia
- Phylum: Chordata
- Class: Aves
- Order: Passeriformes
- Family: Troglodytidae
- Genus: Cantorchilus
- Species: C. thoracicus

Binomial name
- Cantorchilus thoracicus (Salvin, 1865)

Synonyms
- Thryothorus thoracicus

= Stripe-breasted wren =

Species of bird

The stripe-breasted wren (Cantorchilus thoracicus) is a species of bird in the family Troglodytidae. It is found in Honduras, Nicaragua, Costa Rica, and Panama.

== Taxonomy and systematics ==
The stripe-breasted wren is monotypic. It has at times been treated as conspecific with the stripe-throated wren (Cantorchilus leucopogon) and the two form a superspecies.

== Description ==
The stripe-breasted wren is 11.5 to 12.5 cm (4.5 to 4.9 in) long and has a mean weight of 17.6 g (0.62 oz). Adults have a gray-brown crown, dark umber shoulders, back, and rump, and a dull blackish tail with buffy bars. Their face and sides of the neck have white streaks over a blackish base. Their throat and chest have black, white, and gray lengthwise streaks that stop abruptly at the plain olive-brown lower belly. Juveniles' upperparts are more russet than the adults' and the throat and chest have grayish brown, white, and dusky stripes.

== Distribution and habitat ==
The stripe-breasted wren is found on the Caribbean slope of Middle America from eastern Honduras south through northeastern Nicaragua and eastern Costa Rica into Panama almost to the Canal Zone. It inhabits thick vegetation along woodland edges, in clearings, and along streams; in Costa Rica it is also found in cacao and shade coffee plantations. In elevation it ranges from sea level to 1,100 m (3,600 ft).

== Behavior ==
=== Feeding ===
The stripe-breasted wren usually forages in low dense vegetation. Its diet has not been fully documented but is known to include insects and spiders.

=== Breeding ===
The stripe-breasted wren nests between March and July in Costa Rica. Both sexes build the nest; it has two chambers and is draped over a branch; a downward-facing entrance is in one chamber. It is made of plant fibers covered with moss and is typically between 1.5 and 6 m (5 and 20 ft) above ground. The clutch size is two or three.

=== Vocalization ===
The stripe-breasted wren has two very different song types. One, which is apparently sung only by the male, is " a uniform series of whistles on one note" similar to that of some small owls. The other, sung by both sexes antiphonally, is "a cheerful series of liquid bubbling whistles." The species also has a variety of calls.

== Status ==
The IUCN has assessed the stripe-breasted wren as being of Least Concern. It "appears able to adapt to very modified habitats, such as plantations" and occurs in some protected areas.
