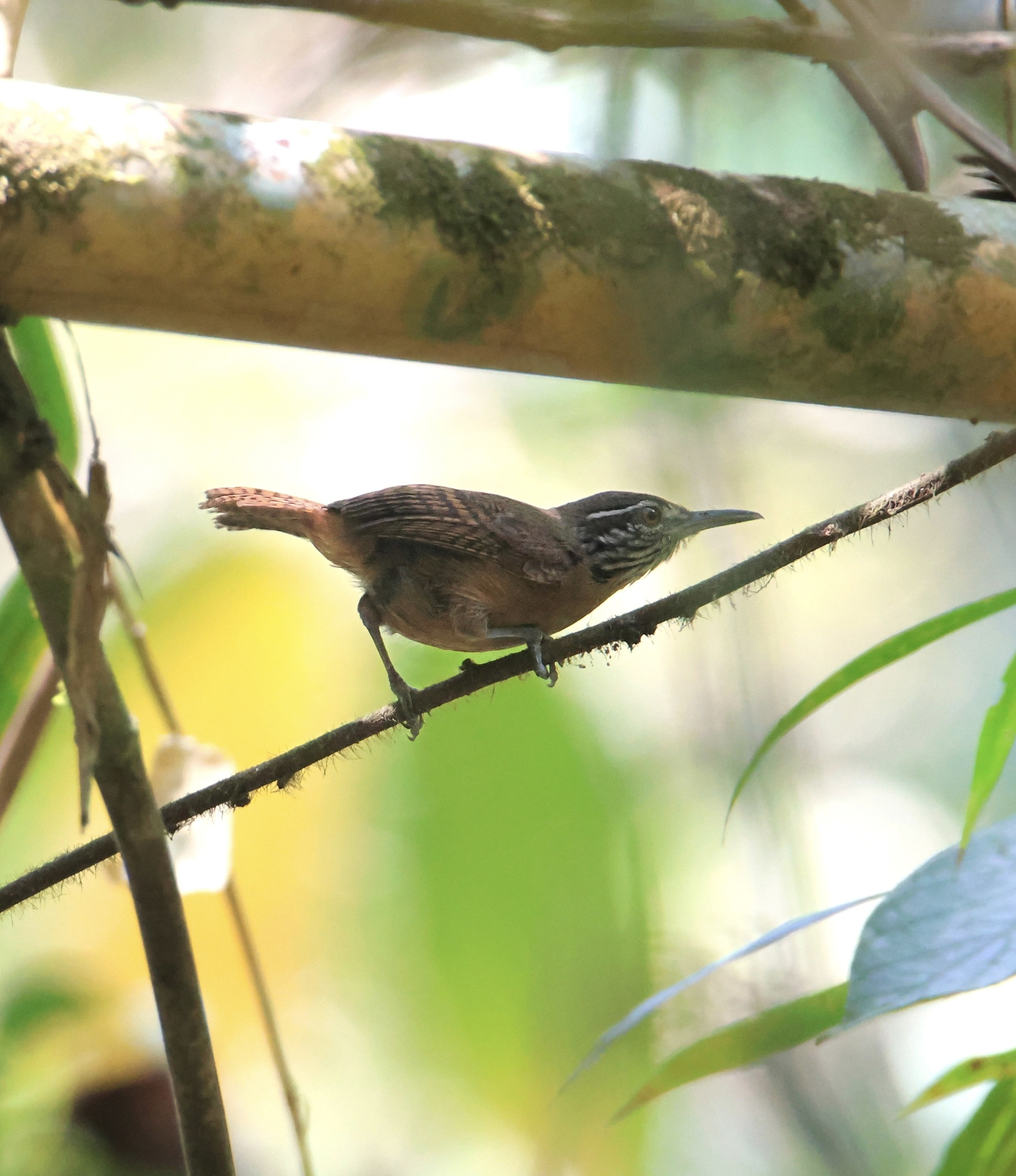

Conservation status
- Least Concern (IUCN 3.1)

Scientific classification
- Kingdom: Animalia
- Phylum: Chordata
- Class: Aves
- Order: Passeriformes
- Family: Troglodytidae
- Genus: Cantorchilus
- Species: C. leucopogon

Binomial name
- Cantorchilus leucopogon (Salvadori & Festa, 1899)

Synonyms
- Thryothorus leucopogon

Audio
- Call recorded in Ecuador

= Stripe-throated wren =

Species of bird

The stripe-throated wren (Cantorchilus leucopogon) is a species of bird in the family Troglodytidae. It is found in Colombia, Ecuador, and Panama.

== Taxonomy and systematics ==
The stripe-throated wren has at times been treated as conspecific with the stripe-breasted wren (Cantorchilus thoracicus) and the two form a superspecies. The species has two subspecies, the nominate C. l. leucopogon and C. l. grisescens.

== Description ==
The stripe-throated wren is 12 cm (4.7 in) long. Adults of the nominate subspecies have a dark brown crown and upperparts; the latter are more rufescent on the rump. Their tail is reddish brown with narrow blackish bars. They have a grayish white supercilium. The rest of the face, chin, and throat have black and grayish white streaks that end abruptly at the deep reddish buff upper chest. That color continues and becomes darker and richer through the belly to the vent. Juveniles are similar to the adults but the facial and throat streaking is less well defined. C. l. grisescens is paler and grayer overall.

== Distribution and habitat ==
The stripe-throated wren of subspecies C. l. grisescens is the more easterly of the two. It is found on the Caribbean slope of eastern Panama into northern Colombia. The nominate C. l. leucopogon is found on the Pacific slope, from eastern Panama south through western Colombia into western Ecuador. It inhabits the edges of várzea and secondary forests from sea level up to 900 m (3,000 ft).

== Behavior ==
=== Feeding ===
The stripe-throated wren forages in pairs, often as part of a mixed-species foraging flock. It typically hunts in thick vegetation between 3 and 10 m (9.8 and 32.8 ft) above the ground. Its diet has not been extensively documented but is known to include insects.

=== Breeding ===
Little is known about the stripe-throated wren's breeding phenology. Its nest is "an untidy ball with side entrance, usually placed near end of small branch with little effort at concealment."

=== Vocalization ===
The stripe-throated wren's song is "a tuneless repetition of 2–3 notes, 'chi-chi-chi'".

== Status ==
The IUCN has assessed the stripe-throated wren as being of Least Concern. However, it is "apparently rather scarce throughout much of its range."
