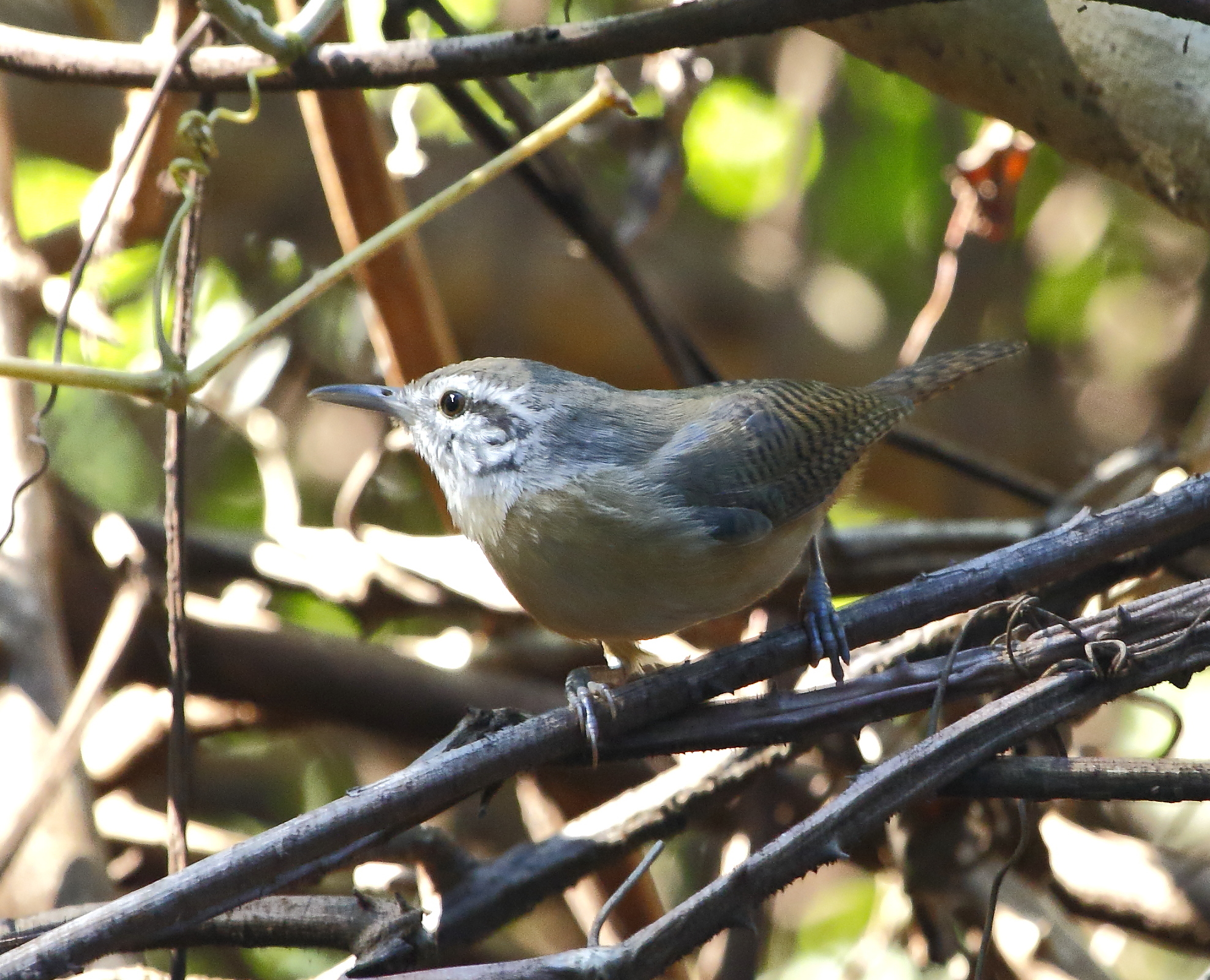

Conservation status
- Least Concern (IUCN 3.1)

Scientific classification
- Kingdom: Animalia
- Phylum: Chordata
- Class: Aves
- Order: Passeriformes
- Family: Troglodytidae
- Genus: Cantorchilus
- Species: C. guarayanus

Binomial name
- Cantorchilus guarayanus (Lafresnaye & D'Orbigny, 1837)

Synonyms
- Thryothorus guarayanus

= Fawn-breasted wren =

Species of bird

The fawn-breasted wren (Cantorchilus guarayanus) is a species of bird in the family Troglodytidae. It is found in Bolivia, Brazil, and Paraguay.

== Taxonomy and systematics ==
The fawn-breasted wren has sometimes been treated as conspecific with the buff-breasted wren (Cantorchilus leucotis), though they have very different vocalizations. The species is monotypic.

== Description ==
The fawn-breasted wren is 13.5 cm (5.3 in) long and weighs 13 to 14 g (0.46 to 0.49 oz). Adults have a plain medium brown crown and upperparts that becomes rufescent on the lower back and rump. Their tail is reddish brown with crisp black bars. They have a narrow white supercilium mostly behind the eye, cheeks mottled gray-white and blackish, and black malar and moustachial stripes. Their chin is whitish, the chest a warm orange-buff, and the belly and vent area a deeper orange-buff. Juveniles are similar but their facial markings are less distinct.

== Distribution and habitat ==
The fawn-breasted wren is found across much of northeastern Bolivia, a fairly thin slice of adjacent western Brazil, and a small part of northeastern Paraguay. It inhabits várzea scrubland and secondary forest, mostly near water. In elevation it ranges up to approximately 400 m (1,300 ft).

== Behavior ==
=== Feeding ===
The fawn-breasted wren forages in pairs during the dry season and small family groups after nesting. It hunts in dense growth, usually from the ground up to 4 m (13 ft) above it, but sometimes as high as 10 m (33 ft). Its diet has not been documented.

=== Breeding ===
Only a few fawn-breasted wren nests have been described, and little has been published about its breeding phenology. Nests are a flimsy dome of grasses and root hairs with a side entrance placed up to 3 m (9.8 ft) above ground in weeds, bushes, or the base of a small palm. The clutch size is two.

=== Vocalization ===
The members of a fawn-breasted wren pair sing antiphonally, the male's part a "cheerilo-choli" and the female's "pew-pew, pew-pew". Calls include a repeated "pew-pew" and harsh clicks.

== Status ==
The IUCN has assessed the fawn-breasted wren as being of Least Concern. Though its population size has not been determined, it is believed to be fairly common to common across its range.
