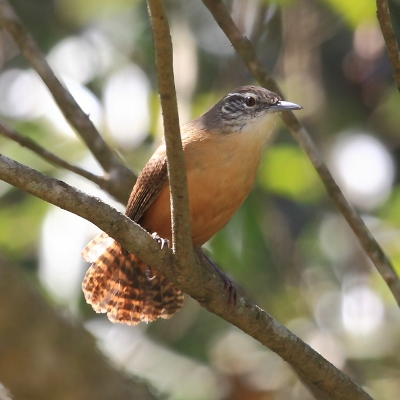
- at Boa Esperança do Sul, São Paulo State, Brazil

Conservation status
- Least Concern (IUCN 3.1)

Scientific classification
- Kingdom: Animalia
- Phylum: Chordata
- Class: Aves
- Order: Passeriformes
- Family: Troglodytidae
- Genus: Cantorchilus
- Species: C. leucotis

Binomial name
- Cantorchilus leucotis (Lafresnaye, 1845)

Synonyms
- Thryothorus leucotis

= Buff-breasted wren =

Species of bird

The buff-breasted wren (Cantorchilus leucotis) is a species of bird in the family Troglodytidae. It is found in the Amazon Basin of northern Brazil and Amazonian Colombia, Ecuador, Peru and northern-border Bolivia, and also the Guianan countries of Guyana, Suriname, and French Guiana. It occurs in non-Amazonian regions of Venezuela and Colombia and its range extends into eastern Panama.

== Taxonomy and systematics ==
As the buff-breasted wren is understood in 2021, it has 11 subspecies. However, there are suggestions that some of them might not be valid, that some might be separate species, and on a larger scale, that the taxonomy of the entire genus Cantorchilus has not been completely resolved.

== Description ==
Male buff-breasted wrens weigh 18.5 to 22.8 g (0.65 to 0.80 oz) and females are lighter at 16.0 to 19.5 g (0.56 to 0.69 oz), but the sexes are otherwise similar. There is considerable variation in plumage across the species' wide range. Adults' head, nape, shoulders, tail, and back are rufescent to grayish brown; the tail is heavily barred. The throat, supercilium, and the rest of the face range from whitish through gray to gray-brown. The chest is buffy and the belly more cinnamon. Fledglings are duller overall than adults and the buff of their chest is paler.

== Distribution and habitat ==
The core range of the buff-breasted wren is northern and central South America, especially the Amazon Basin; the range includes most of Venezuela, and northern Colombia extending into eastern Panama. In the west at the Andes and southwards through Amazonian eastern Peru, it only enters the extreme northwest border regions of Bolivia. The range includes the Guianas, the Amazon River outlet island Ilha de Marajo, and Panama's Pearl Islands.

The range southeastwards in Brazil covers the entire central-southern and southeast Amazon Basin. From here the range extends almost to the southeastern Atlantic coast of Brazil, but is mainly in the southern Cerrado, and possibly into the adjacent northeastern Pantanal.

Buff-breasted wrens occur in a variety of habitats, but most are characterized by low to medium height vegetation. Examples include secondary forest and its edges and regenerating clearings. Of lesser importance are mangrove forest and shade coffee plantations. In Venezuela they inhabit only gallery forest along waterways in otherwise grassland areas. In Amazonia they are mostly found on the borders of várzea forest and on older river islands. They have been observed in primary forest in Bolivia and the subspecies C. l. collinus inhabits the dry scrub of Colombia's Serranía de Macuira.

== Behavior ==
=== Feeding ===
The buff-breasted wren forages in pairs or family groups and will join mixed-species foraging flocks. Typically they hunt between 1 and 6 m (3.3 and 19.7 ft) above ground but also do so on the forest floor and as high as 18 m (59 ft). They hop or make short flights through thick vegetation, gleaning and probing for insects, spiders, and other small arthropods.

=== Breeding ===
Buff-breasted wrens build both breeding and "dormitory" nests. The latter are used for roosting. Both are globular and built of small sticks, grasses, and other relatively coarse fibers. Breeding nests are lined with finer material; the dormitory nests tend to be flimsier than the breeding ones. Both have a tunnel entrance, which on the breeding nest tends to be longer and more downturned. Both are built by both members of a pair and juveniles may help construct the dormitories. Most nests are placed between 1 and 2 m (3.3 and 6.6 ft) above ground, though they may be as high as 10 m (33 ft) up. Trees, shrubs, vine tangles, and palms are among the many substrates for the nests. The clutch size is usually three but many nests have only two. Shiny cowbirds (Molothrus bonariensis) and striped cuckoos (Tapera naevia) are significant nest parasites.

=== Vocalization ===
Both male and female buff-breasted wrens have large song repertoires. Often a male will begin a song and the female will complete it. They also have a variety of calls.

== Status ==
The IUCN has assessed the buff-breasted wren as being of Least Concern. The species has a large range and is believed to be common throughout it.
