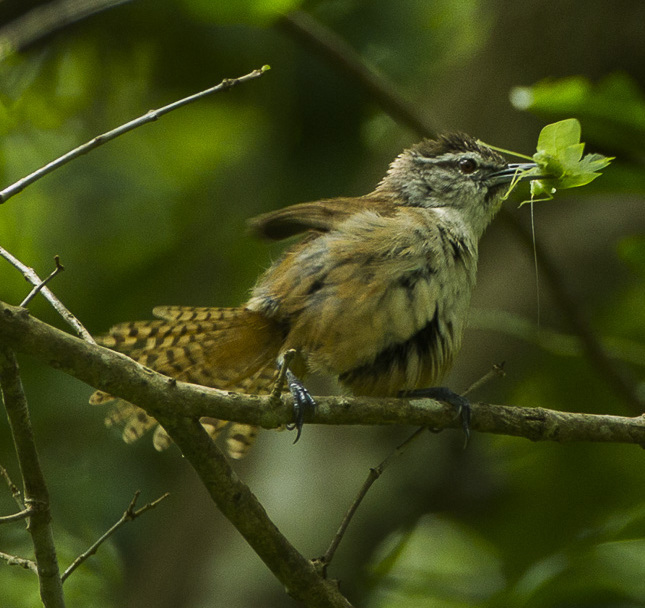
- In Chiapas, Mexico

Conservation status
- Least Concern (IUCN 3.1)

Scientific classification
- Kingdom: Animalia
- Phylum: Chordata
- Class: Aves
- Order: Passeriformes
- Family: Troglodytidae
- Genus: Cantorchilus
- Species: C. modestus

Binomial name
- Cantorchilus modestus (Cabanis, 1861)

Synonyms
- Thryothorus modestus

= Cabanis's wren =

Species of bird

Cabanis's wren (Cantorchilus modestus) is a species of bird in the family Troglodytidae. It is found in Belize, Costa Rica, El Salvador, Guatemala, Honduras, Mexico, and Nicaragua.

== Taxonomy and systematics ==
Cabanis's wren, with what are now the canebrake wren (C. zeledoni) and the isthmian wren (C. elutus), were called the plain wren. The three were split from each other in 2016 on the basis of a 2015 publication that described their different vocalizations and genetic divergence. Cabanis's wren is monotypic according to the International Ornithological Committee (IOC) and the Clements taxonomy. However, BirdLife International (BLI) retains C. modestus as "plain wren" with elutus as a subspecies of it rather than as a full species.

== Description ==
Cabanis's wren is 12.5 to 14 cm (4.9 to 5.5 in) long. Two males weighed 17.8 and 19.1 g (0.63 and 0.67 oz) and two females 16.0 and 16.6 g (0.56 and 0.59 oz). Adults have a dark gray-brown crown, a rufous-brown back, an orange-rufous rump, and a rufescent brown tail with narrow darker bars. They have a white supercilium, a gray-brown stripe behind the eye, and cheeks mottled gray-brown and gray-white. Their throat is white, the chest pale grayish buff, and the belly buffy white between orange-buff flanks. Individuals in the far northern part of the species' range tend to be darker and less rufous on the back. Immatures are a duller version of the adult.

== Distribution and habitat ==
Cabanis's wren is found from the Mexican states of Oaxaca and Chiapas south through Belize, Guatemala, El Salvador, Honduras, and Nicaragua to the Pacific side of central Costa Rica. It inhabits both dry and humid areas, occurring in a variety of surroundings including forest edges, second growth, and gardens. In elevation it ranges from sea level to approximately 2,000 m (6,600 ft).

== Behavior ==
=== Feeding ===
Cabanis's wren usually forages in pairs in low dense vegetation, though it occasionally will hunt higher in trees. Its diet is mostly insects and spiders.

=== Breeding ===
The nest of Cabanis's wren is roughly football-shaped with an entrance hole on the side. It is constructed of grass and other vegetable fibers, lined with softer material, and placed in dense vegetation within 3 m (9.8 ft) of the ground. The usual clutch size is two though clutches of three eggs are known.

=== Vocalization ===
The song of Cabanis's wren is "a loud motif of 3–4 clear whistles" . Its calls include a "harsh 'chur' and a "rippling, tinkling 'chi-cho-chi'" .

== Status ==
The IUCN has assessed Cabanis's wren as being of Least concern. It is common to abundant and does well in human-modified landscapes.
