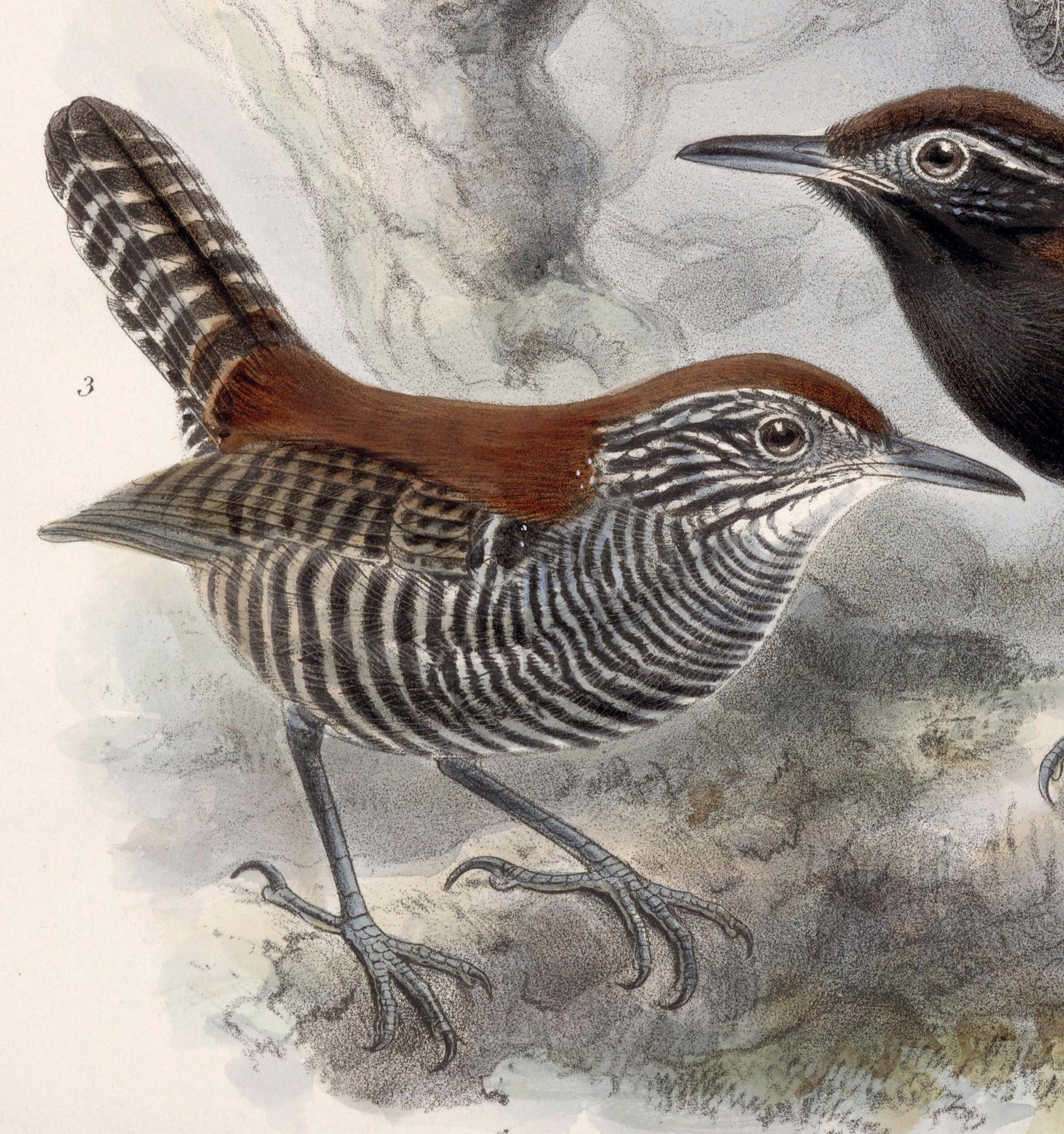

Conservation status
- Least Concern (IUCN 3.1)

Scientific classification
- Domain: Eukaryota
- Kingdom: Animalia
- Phylum: Chordata
- Class: Aves
- Order: Passeriformes
- Family: Troglodytidae
- Genus: Cantorchilus
- Species: C. semibadius

Binomial name
- Cantorchilus semibadius (Salvin, 1870)

Synonyms
- Thryothorus semibadius

= Riverside wren =

Species of bird

The riverside wren (Cantorchilus semibadius) is a species of bird in the family Troglodytidae. It is found in Costa Rica and Panama.

== Taxonomy and systematics ==
The riverside wren has sometimes been treated as conspecific with bay wren (Cantorchilus nigricapillus) but their plumages are quite different as are DNA analyses. The species is monotypic.

== Description ==
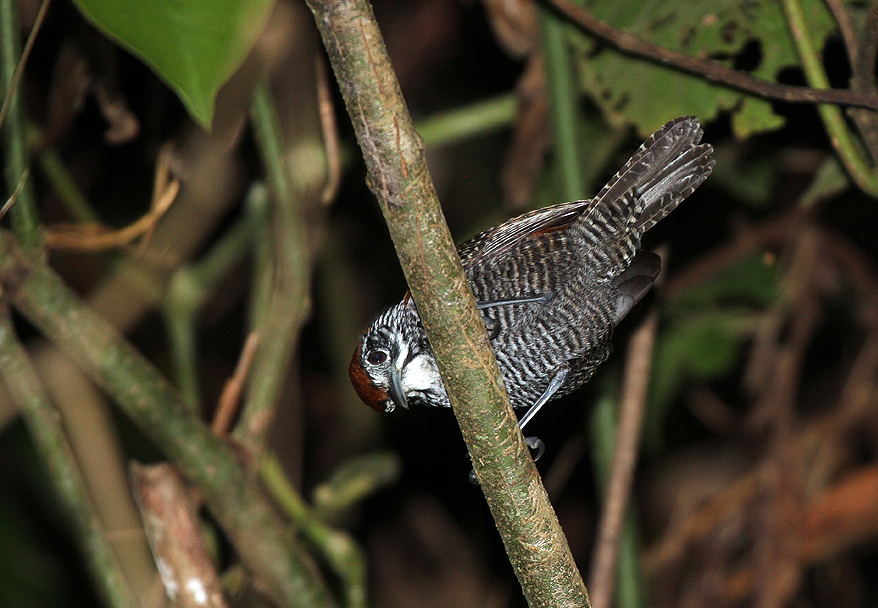
In Costa Rica

The riverside wren is 13 to 14 cm (5.1 to 5.5 in) long and weighs 17 g (0.60 oz). The adults have a bright orange-brown crown; chestnut nape, back, and rump; and a blackish tail with buff-white bars. They have a black-over-white supercilium and the rest of the face is streaked and spotted black and white. From throat to vent their underparts are pale gray with narrow black bars; the gray becomes somewhat buffy to the rear. Juveniles are duller overall, have fine black scaling on the crown, and the underparts' black bars are not as crisp.

== Distribution and habitat ==
The riverside wren is found along the Pacific slope from Costa Rica's Gulf of Nicoya into western Panama. It inhabits dense vegetation, preferably along watercourses, swampy edges of woodlands, or on steep precipices. In elevation it ranges from sea level to 1,200 m (3,900 ft).

== Behavior ==
=== Feeding ===
The riverside wren forages near the ground, usually in pairs or family groups. It sometimes briefly joins other species at army ant swarms. Its diet includes insects and other invertebrates.

=== Breeding ===
The riverside wren appears to nest at almost any time of the year. Its nest is globular made of fine fibers; it drapes over a branch to form two chambers with an entrance hole in the outer one. It is often placed over flowing water, 1.5 to 2.2 m (4.9 to 7.2 ft) above it or the ground. The species also constructs "dormitory" nests for roosting. The clutch size is two.

=== Vocalization ===
Both sexes of riverside wren sing, repeated "loud ringing phrases" and followed by different phrases, also repeated. Their calls include "harsh churr and various clear tinkling notes".

== Status ==
The IUCN has assessed the riverside wren as being of Least Concern. However, its "population trend is difficult to determine because of uncertainty over the impacts of habitat modification on population sizes."
