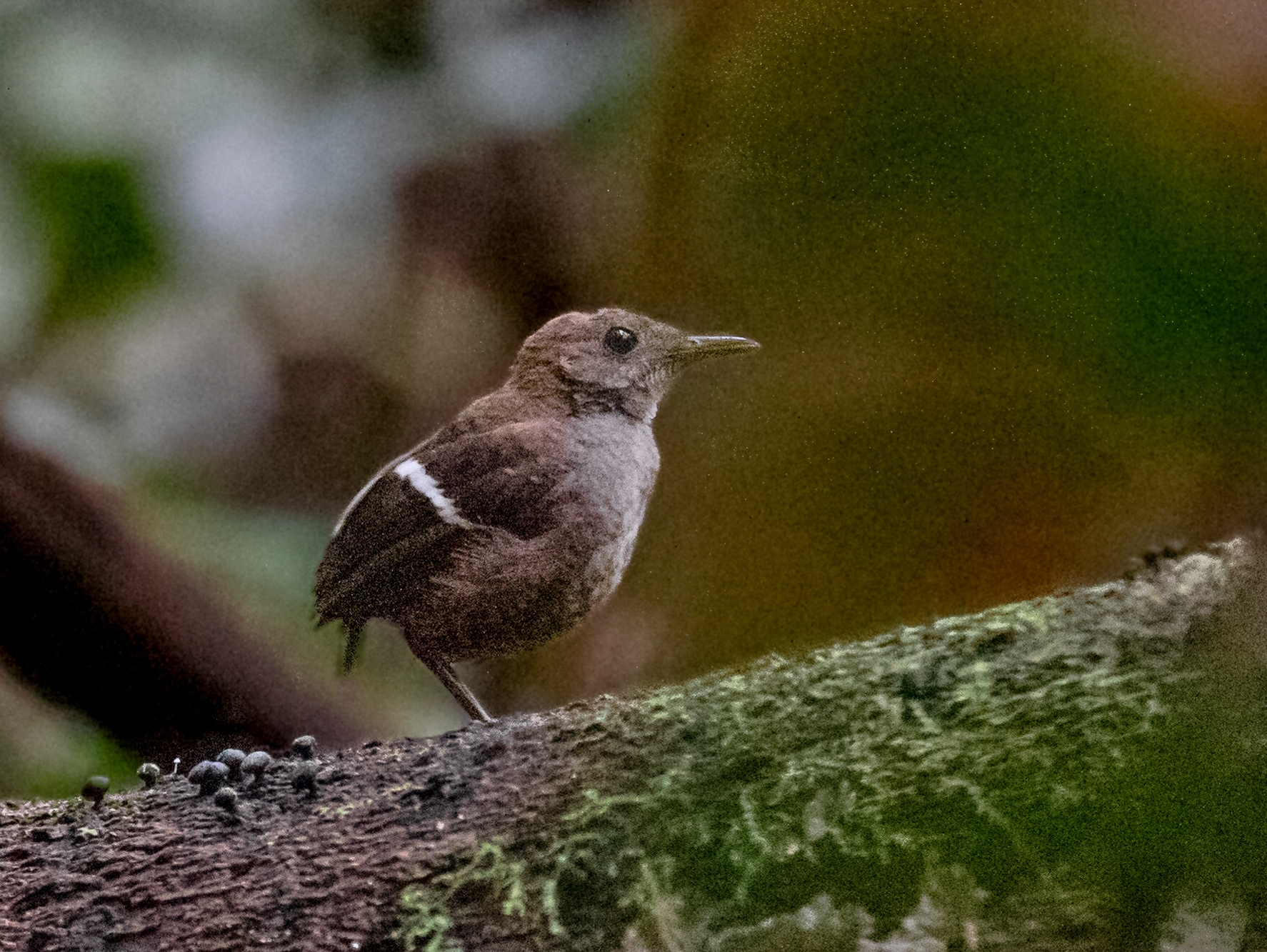

Conservation status
- Least Concern (IUCN 3.1)

Scientific classification
- Kingdom: Animalia
- Phylum: Chordata
- Class: Aves
- Order: Passeriformes
- Family: Troglodytidae
- Genus: Microcerculus
- Species: M. bambla

Binomial name
- Microcerculus bambla (Boddaert, 1783)

Synonyms
- Formicarius bambla (protonym)

= Wing-banded wren =

Species of bird

Song of Wing-banded wren

The wing-banded wren (Microcerculus bambla) is a species of bird in the family Troglodytidae. It is found in Brazil, Ecuador, French Guiana, Guyana, Peru, Suriname, and Venezuela.

== Taxonomy and systematics ==
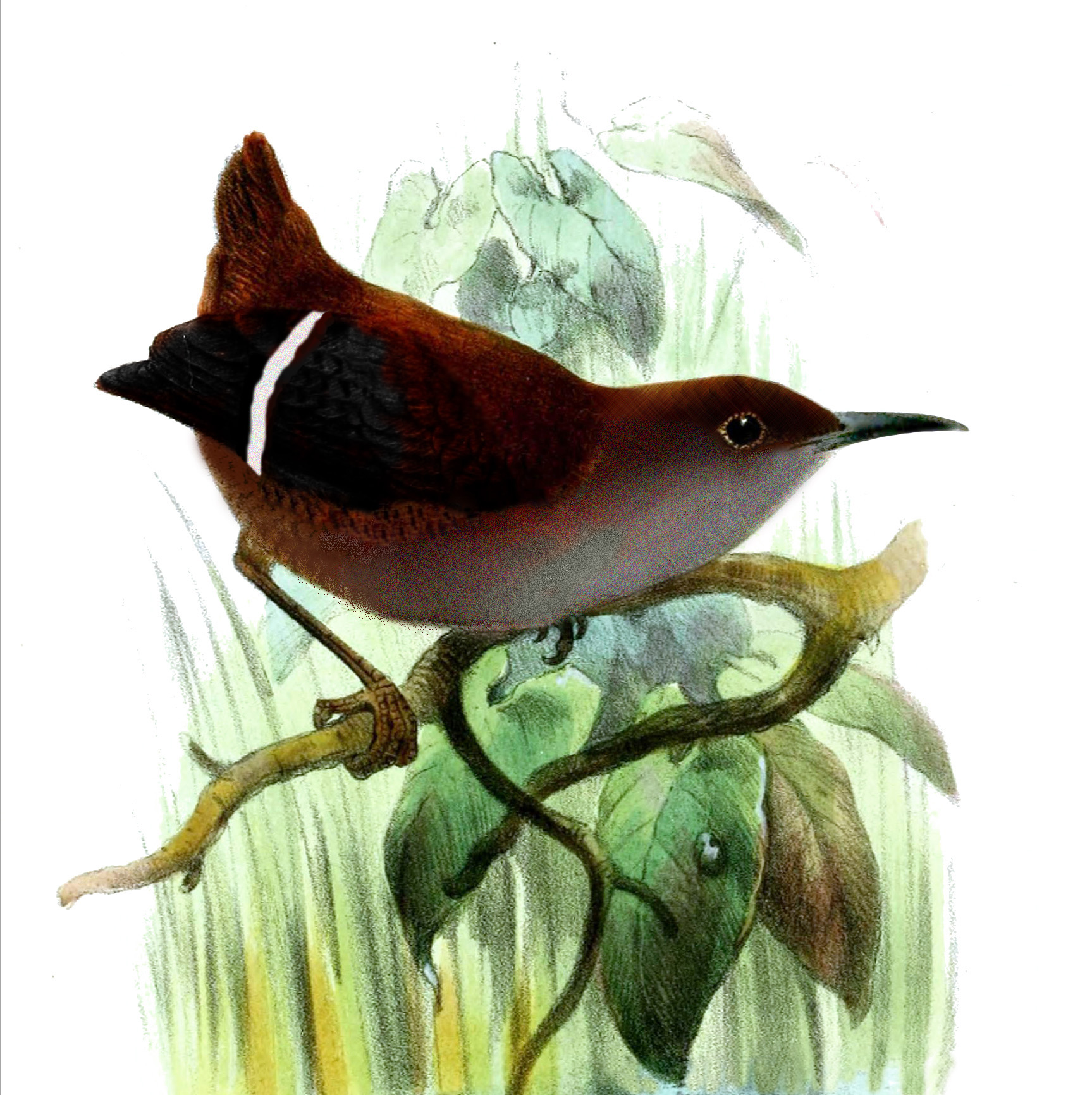

The wing-banded wren was described by the French polymath Georges-Louis Leclerc, Comte de Buffon in 1779 in his Histoire Naturelle des Oiseaux from a specimen collected in Cayenne, French Guiana. The bird was also illustrated in a hand-colored plate engraved by François-Nicolas Martinet in the Planches Enluminées D'Histoire Naturelle that was produced under the supervision of Edme-Louis Daubenton to accompany Buffon's text. Neither the plate caption nor Buffon's description included a scientific name but in 1783 the Dutch naturalist Pieter Boddaert coined the binomial name Formicarius bambla in his catalogue of the Planches Enluminées. The wing-banded wren is now one of four species in genus Microcerculus that was introduced by the English naturalist Osbert Salvin in 1861. The genus name is from the Ancient Greek mikros meaning "small" and kerkos meaning "tail". The specific epithet bambla is a homophone from the French bande blanche meaning "white band".

Three subspecies are recognized:

- M. b. albigularis Sclater, PL (1858)
- M. b. caurensis von Berlepsch & Hartert (1902)
- M. b. bambla Boddaert (1783)

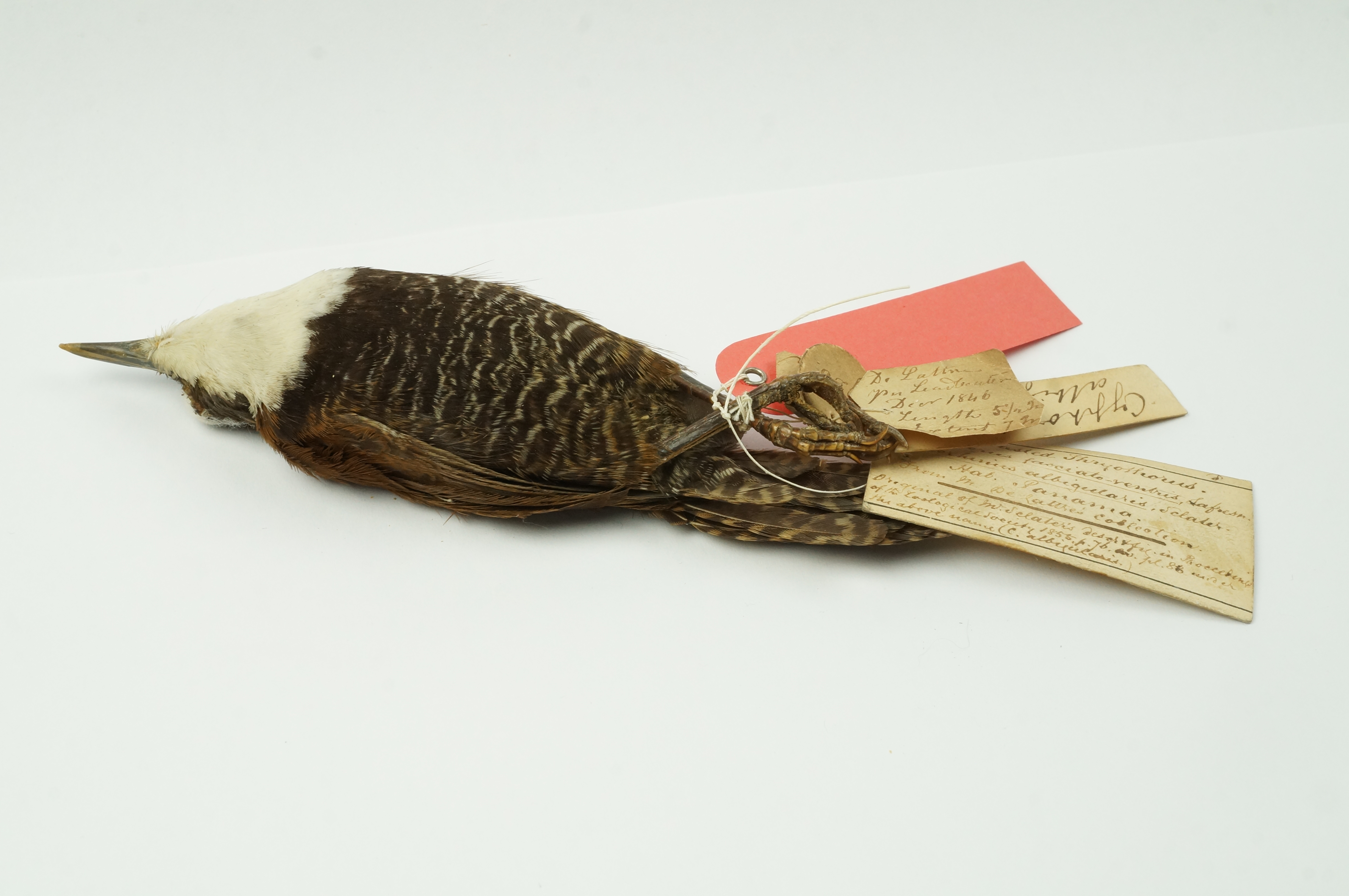
Holotype of Cyphorinus albigularis Sclater (NML-VZ D4925) held at World Museum, National Museums Liverpool

A holotype of Wing-banded Wren Cyphorinus albigularis Sclater (Proc. Zool. Soc. London. pt. 23, 1855, p. 76, pl. 88). An adult male is held in the vertebrate zoology collection of National Museums Liverpool at World Museum, with accession number NML-VZ D4925. The specimen was collected in Panama by A. de Lattre. The specimen came to the Liverpool national collection via the 13th Earl of Derby collection which was bequeathed to the people of Liverpool in 1851.

== Description ==
The wing-banded wren is 11.5 cm (4.5 in) long and weighs 17 to 19 g (0.60 to 0.67 oz). Adults of the nominate subspecies have a blackish-brown crown, upperparts, and tail. The upperparts have obscure dusky markings and the tail has obscure darker brown bars. Its dark chocolate-brown wing shows a broad white band when closed. It face is dark brown, the chin and throat gray, the chest gray-brown with dark tips on the feathers, and the belly and flanks a purer brown than the chest. The belly and flanks have faint bars. The juvenile's underparts appear scaly and it does not have the white wingbar. The upperparts of M. b. caurensis are a brighter rufous than the nominate's and it does not have the dusky markings on the back and breast. M. b. bambla is similar to caurensis but has a paler throat.

== Distribution and habitat ==
The subspecies of wing-banded wren are found thus:

- M. b. albigularis, eastern Ecuador, northern and south-central Peru, and northwestern Brazil
- M. b. caurensis, extreme eastern Colombia and southern and southeastern Venezuela
- M. b. bambla, extreme eastern Venezuela, the Guianas, and northern Brazil

The wing-banded wren inhabits lowland rainforest, both those with a dense understory and more open ones. It appears to require a wet understory with many rotting logs. In Venezuela it mostly ranges from sea level to 1,100 m (3,600 ft) but can be found as high as 1,500 m (4,900 ft).

== Behavior ==
=== Feeding ===
The wing-banded wren forages on and very near the ground, preferring to explore rotten logs and other woody detritus. Unlike other members of its genus, it seems to only rarely forage in leaf litter. Its diet is mostly arthropods but it has also been seen carrying tiny frogs to a nest.

=== Breeding ===
Two wing-banded wren nests have been described. Both were found in late March in French Guiana and each held a well-grown nestling being fed by both parents. Both nests were about 2 m (6.6 ft) above ground in a cavity in an arboreal termite nest. The cavities were probably excavated by a yellow-billed jacamar (Galbula albirostris).

=== Vocalization ===
The wing-banded wren's song is "a beautiful series of 3–6 clear, pure high-pitched notes separated by short pauses", sometimes extended by a "long, sustained glissando". Its call note is "a sharp metallic 'click'".

== Status ==
The IUCN has assessed the wing-banded wren as being of Least Concern. Though it does not appear to be common anywhere, it "appears to be at relatively little risk at present, as large parts of its range are very sparsely populated by human beings."
