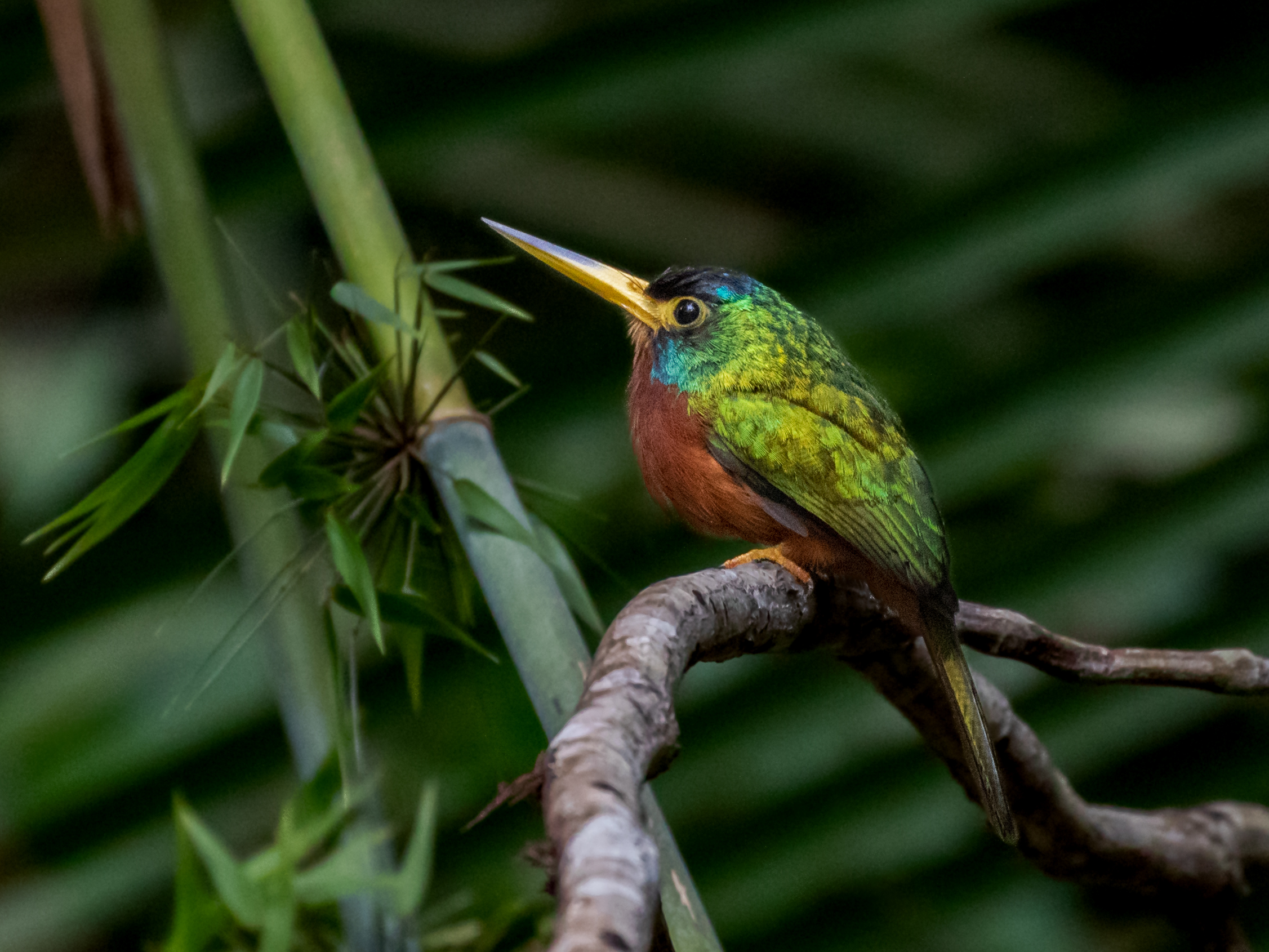
- Male
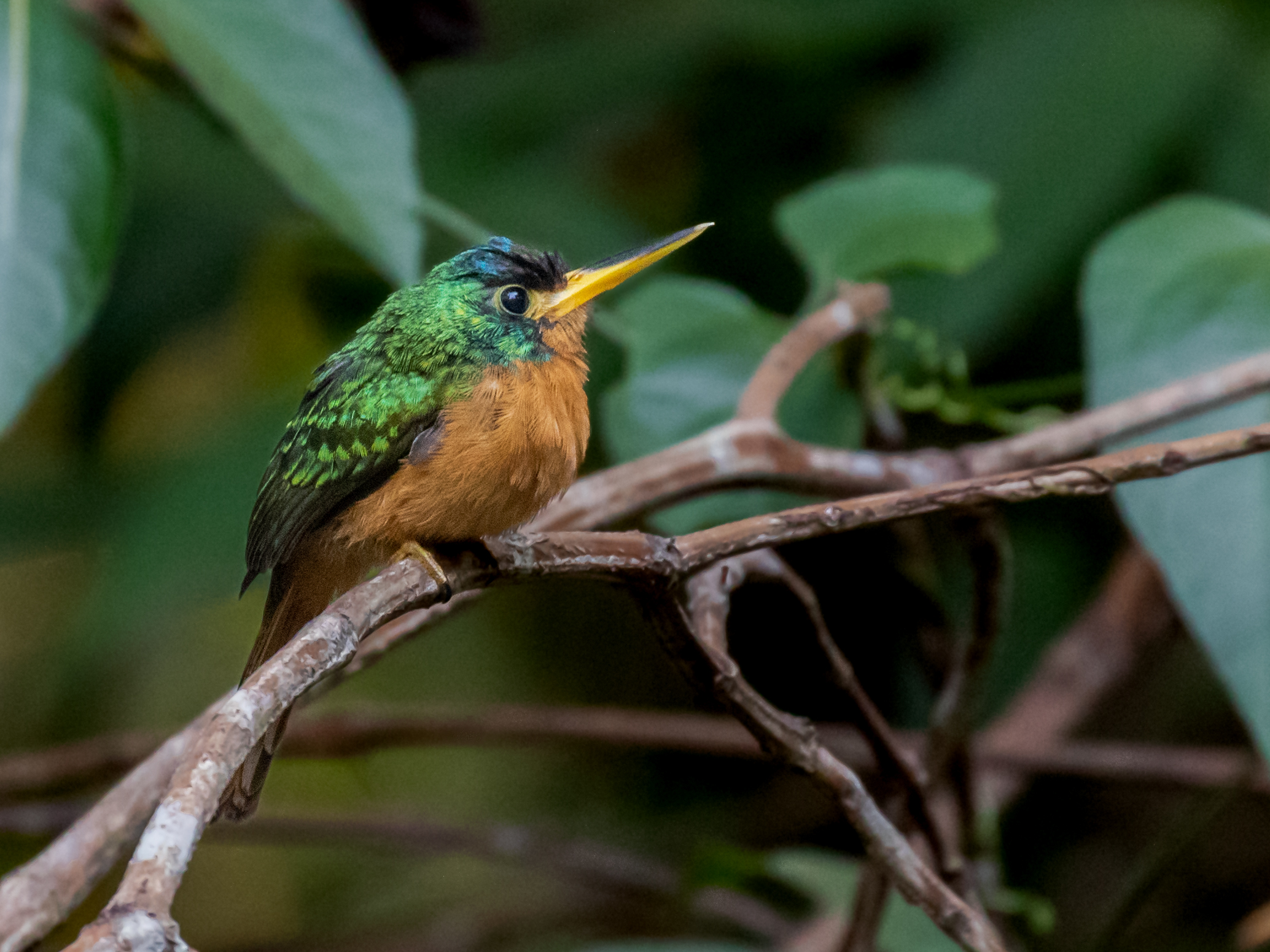
- Female

Conservation status
- Least Concern (IUCN 3.1)

Scientific classification
- Kingdom: Animalia
- Phylum: Chordata
- Class: Aves
- Order: Piciformes
- Family: Galbulidae
- Genus: Galbula
- Species: G. cyanicollis

Binomial name
- Galbula cyanicollis Cassin, 1851

= Blue-necked jacamar =

Species of bird

The blue-necked jacamar or blue-cheeked jacamar (Galbula cyanicollis) is a species of bird in the family Galbulidae. It is found in Brazil, Bolivia, and Peru.

== Taxonomy and systematics ==
The blue-necked jacamar is monotypic. It and the yellow-billed jacamar (Galbula albirostris) were at one time considered conspecific but have been treated as a superspecies since approximately 1974.

== Description ==
The blue-necked jacamar is 19 to 22 cm (7.5 to 8.7 in) long and weighs 21 to 26 g (0.74 to 0.92 oz). The male's upper parts are shiny green and the underparts chestnut. The face is steely blue to green on an east to west gradient. The female is duller and its underparts are tawny buff.

== Distribution and habitat ==
The blue-necked jacamar occurs east of the Andes and south of the Amazon River. It is found in eastern Peru, far northern Bolivia, and in Brazil east to Maranhão and south to Rondônia and northern Mato Grosso. It inhabits the interior of terra firme and várzea forests. There it is found in the lower strata and often in small gaps. It also occurs in gallery forest in the cerrado of Brazil. In elevation it ranges up to 900 m (3,000 ft).

== Behavior ==
=== Feeding ===
The blue-necked jacamar's diet is a large variety of insects. It perches on exposed branches and sallies from there to catch its flying prey.

=== Breeding ===
Two blue-necked jacamar nest burrows were found in arboreal termite nests in Brazil, one in June and the other in October; each held two eggs. Birds in breeding condition were found in September.

=== Vocalization ===
The voice of the blue-necked jacamar is essentially the same as that of the yellow-billed. A song is here and a call here.

== Status ==
The IUCN has assessed the blue-necked jacamar as being of Least Concern. It occurs in several protected areas and is generally common over its range. However, "Owing to its greater reliance on intact forest understorey, this species, as G. albirostris, is likely to be more susceptible to deforestation than are most other jacamars."
