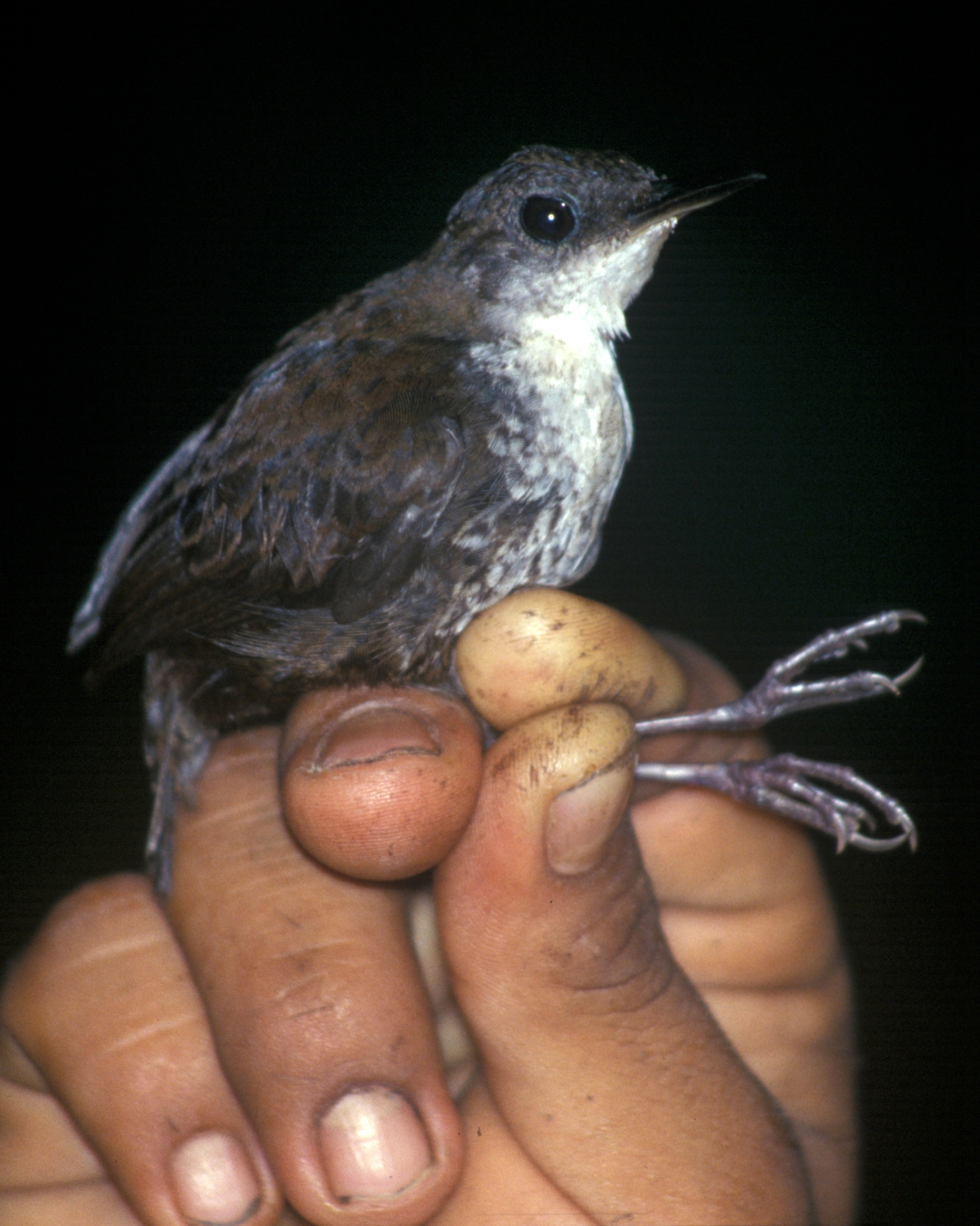
- Southern nightingale-wren (M. marginatus)

Scientific classification
- Kingdom: Animalia
- Phylum: Chordata
- Class: Aves
- Order: Passeriformes
- Family: Troglodytidae
- Genus: Microcerculus; Salvin, 1861

Type species
- Turdus bambla

= Microcerculus =

Genus of birds

Microcerculus is a genus of birds in the wren family Troglodytidae that are endemic to Central America and tropical regions of South America.

These are small wrens with very short tails, long legs and a long bill. They forage on or near the ground in humid forests.

The genus was first mentioned in print by the English naturalist Osbert Salvin in 1861. Salvin credits the zoologist Philip Sclater for coining the name but Sclater's book on American birds was not published until 1862. Some taxonomists credit Sclater for erecting the genus in 1862. The type species was subsequently designated as the wing-banded wren (Microcerculus bambla) by the American naturalist Spencer Baird in 1864. The genus name is a diminutive of the Ancient Greek mikros meaning "small" and kerkos meaning "tail".

The genus contains the following species:

- Wing-banded wren (Microcerculus bambla)
- Southern nightingale-wren (Microcerculus marginatus)
- Northern nightingale-wren (Microcerculus philomela)
- Flutist wren (Microcerculus ustulatus)
