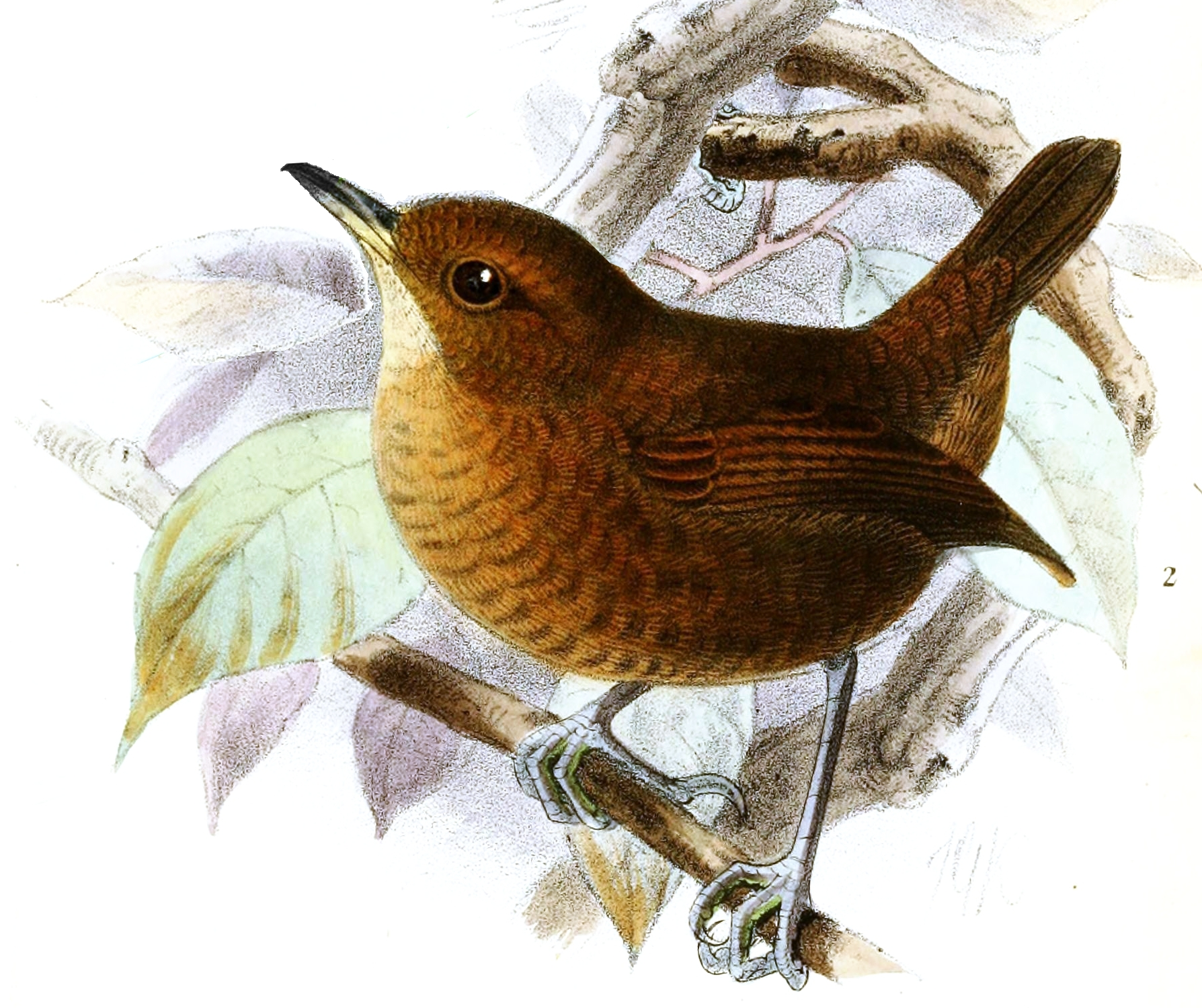

Conservation status
- Least Concern (IUCN 3.1)

Scientific classification
- Kingdom: Animalia
- Phylum: Chordata
- Class: Aves
- Order: Passeriformes
- Family: Troglodytidae
- Genus: Microcerculus
- Species: M. ustulatus

Binomial name
- Microcerculus ustulatus Salvin & Godman, 1883

= Flutist wren =

Species of bird

The flutist wren (Microcerculus ustulatus) is a species of bird in the family Troglodytidae. It is restricted to humid highland forest in the Tepui region of northern Brazil, Guyana, and Venezuela.

== Taxonomy and systematics ==
The flutist wren has four subspecies, the nominate Microcerculus ustulatus ustulatus, M. u. duidae, M. u. lunatipectus, and M. u. obscurus.

== Description ==
The flutist wren is approximately 11.5 cm (4.5 in) long and weighs approximately 22 g (0.78 oz). The nominate adult is generally chocolate brown, somewhat darker on the lower belly and vent area. The crown has faint scalloping, the lower back, rump, and chest have a reddish tinge, the chin is a paler brown. The chest also has a scaly appearance. The juvenile is similar but has obscure dark barring on its underside. M. u. duidae is overall paler and less rufous than the nominate. M. u. lunatipectus's underside has the heaviest and most extensive scaling of all the subspecies. M. u. obscurus has a darker upperside and a redder underside than the nominate.

== Distribution and habitat ==
The nominate M. u. ustulatus flutist wren is found in western Guyana, southeastern Venezuela, and the immediately adjoining part of northern Brazil. M. u. duidae is found in Amazonas and western Bolívar states of Venezuela. M. u. lunatipectus is found in central Bolívar state and M. u. obscurus in eastern Bolívar state.

The flutist wren is a bird of mountains, inhabiting dense humid subtropical montane forest, including the flat tops of some tepuis. In elevation it ranges from 860 to 2,100 m (2,820 to 6,890 ft).

== Behavior ==
=== Feeding ===
The flutist wren usually forages on the forest floor, but sometimes also a little above it. Its diet is known to be arthropods but no details have been published.

=== Breeding ===
No information has been published about the flutist wren's breeding phenology.

=== Vocalization ===
The flutist wren's primary song is "a superb glissando which, after a couple of introductory notes, gradually and slowly slides up the scale". It has a similar alternate song, "but with notes more clipped and gradually dropping in pitch."

== Status ==
The IUCN has assessed the flutist wren as being of Least Concern. Though it has a restricted range, it is rather common, and much of its range has no human inhabitants.
