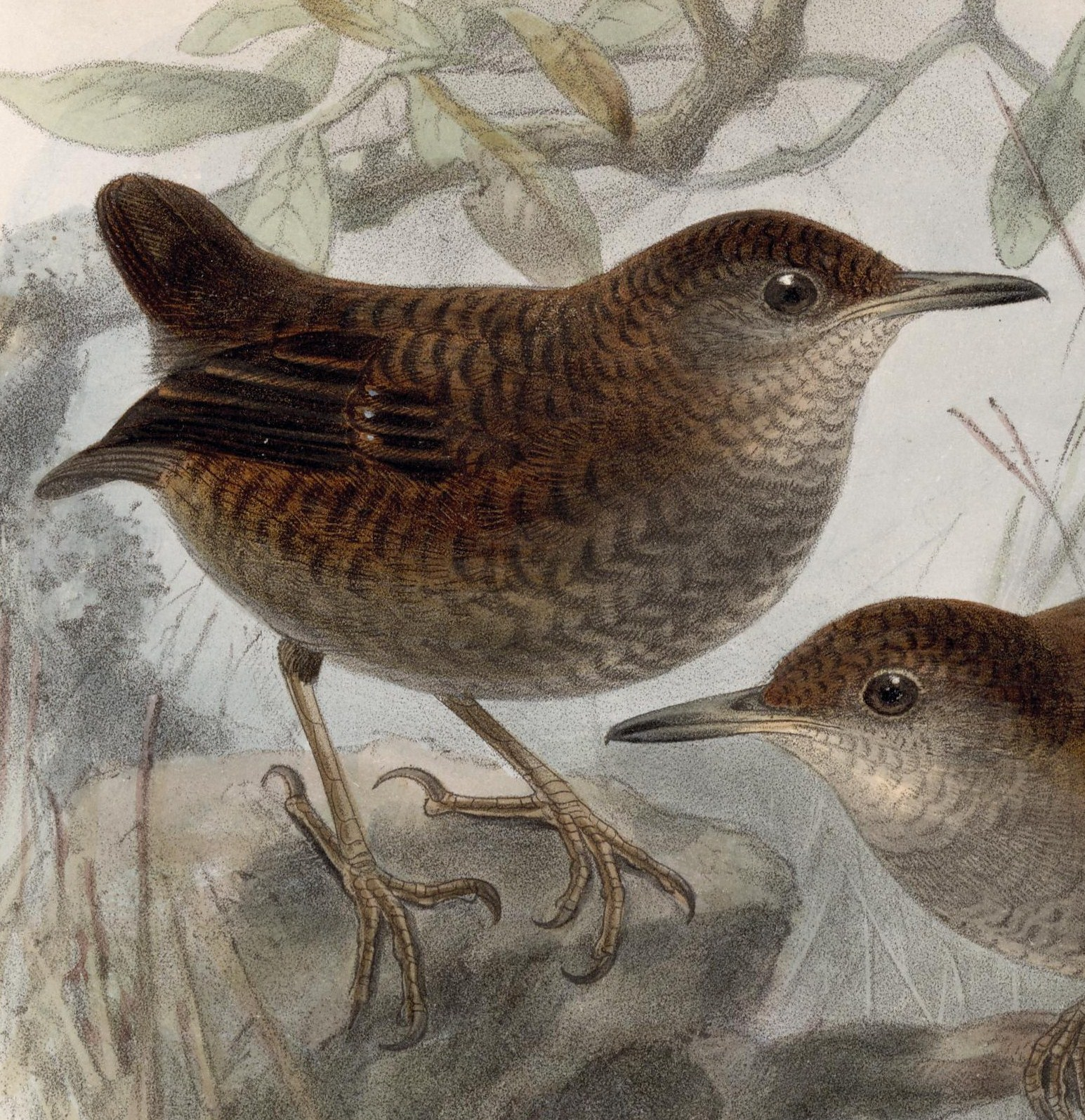

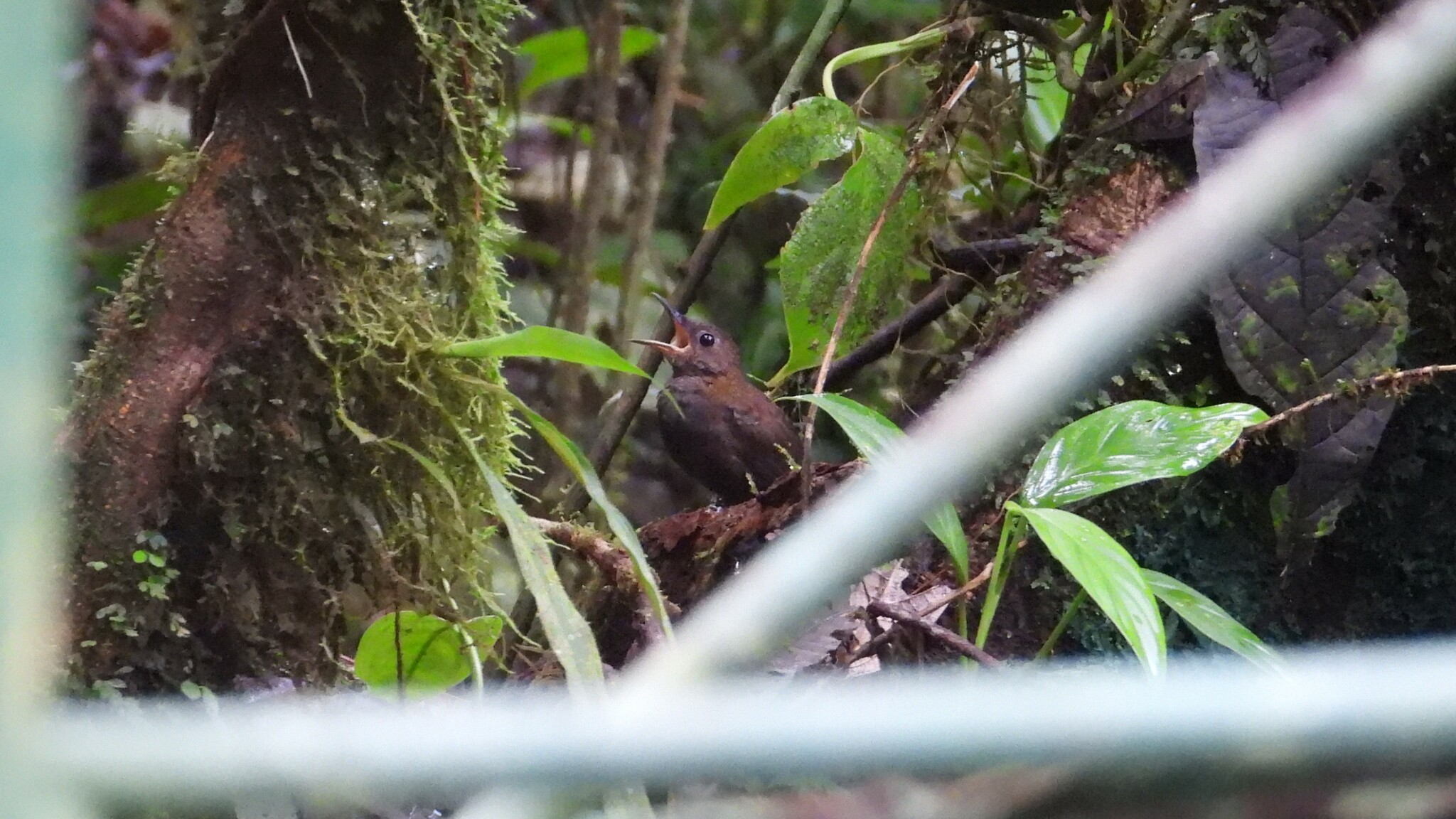

Conservation status
- Near Threatened (IUCN 3.1)

Scientific classification
- Kingdom: Animalia
- Phylum: Chordata
- Class: Aves
- Order: Passeriformes
- Family: Troglodytidae
- Genus: Microcerculus
- Species: M. philomela

Binomial name
- Microcerculus philomela (Salvin, 1861)

= Northern nightingale-wren =

Species of bird

The northern nightingale-wren (Microcerculus philomela), or nightingale wren, is a species of passerine bird in the family Troglodytidae. It is found in Belize, Costa Rica, Guatemala, Honduras, Mexico, and Nicaragua.

== Taxonomy and systematics ==
The northern nightingale-wren forms a species pair with the southern nightingale-wren (Microcerculus marginatus) and was in the past considered conspecific with it. It is currently treated as a species in its own right by the International Ornithological Committee (IOC) and the Clements taxonomy, though under different English names. It is monotypic.

== Description ==
The northern nightingale-wren is 10 to 11.5 cm (3.9 to 4.5 in) long; seven males weighed 17.4 to 21.5 g (0.61 to 0.76 oz) and four females 16.4 to 17.4 g (0.58 to 0.61 oz). Adults are almost entirely dark brown, but with a dark gray throat and breast. Black tips on feathers of both the upper- and undersides give a scalloped appearance. Juveniles are similar though the scaling on their upperparts is darker and that on the underparts is whitish to pale gray.

== Distribution and habitat ==
The northern nightingale-wren is found from Chiapas in Mexico through Guatemala, southern Belize, Honduras, and Nicaragua into northern Costa Rica. It mostly occurs along the Atlantic side but is found locally on the Pacific side in Chiapas and Costa Rica. In Mexico it ranges in elevation from near sea level to 1,400 m (4,600 ft), and in Costa Rica occasionally up to that level but more commonly only as high as 1,200 m (3,900 ft).

The northern nightingale-wren inhabits the interior of lowland tropical forest. It favors virgin evergreen forest and undisturbed cloud forest.

== Behavior ==
=== Feeding ===
The northern nightingale-wren forages on and near the ground, in undergrowth, brush piles, and on fallen logs. It opportunistically follows army ant swarms. Its diet is almost entirely insects.

=== Breeding ===
The northern nightingale-wren is reported to breed between May and September in Costa Rica, but little else is known about its nesting biology.

=== Vocalization ===
The northern nightingale-wren's song is a "confident to hesitant, rising and falling series of whistles". It is sung during most of the year and often from low perches.

== Status ==
The IUCN has assessed the northern nightingale-wren as being of Near Threatened. However, because of its preference for undisturbed forest, it is considered under threat in much of its range due to the clearing and fragmentation of forest for agriculture.
