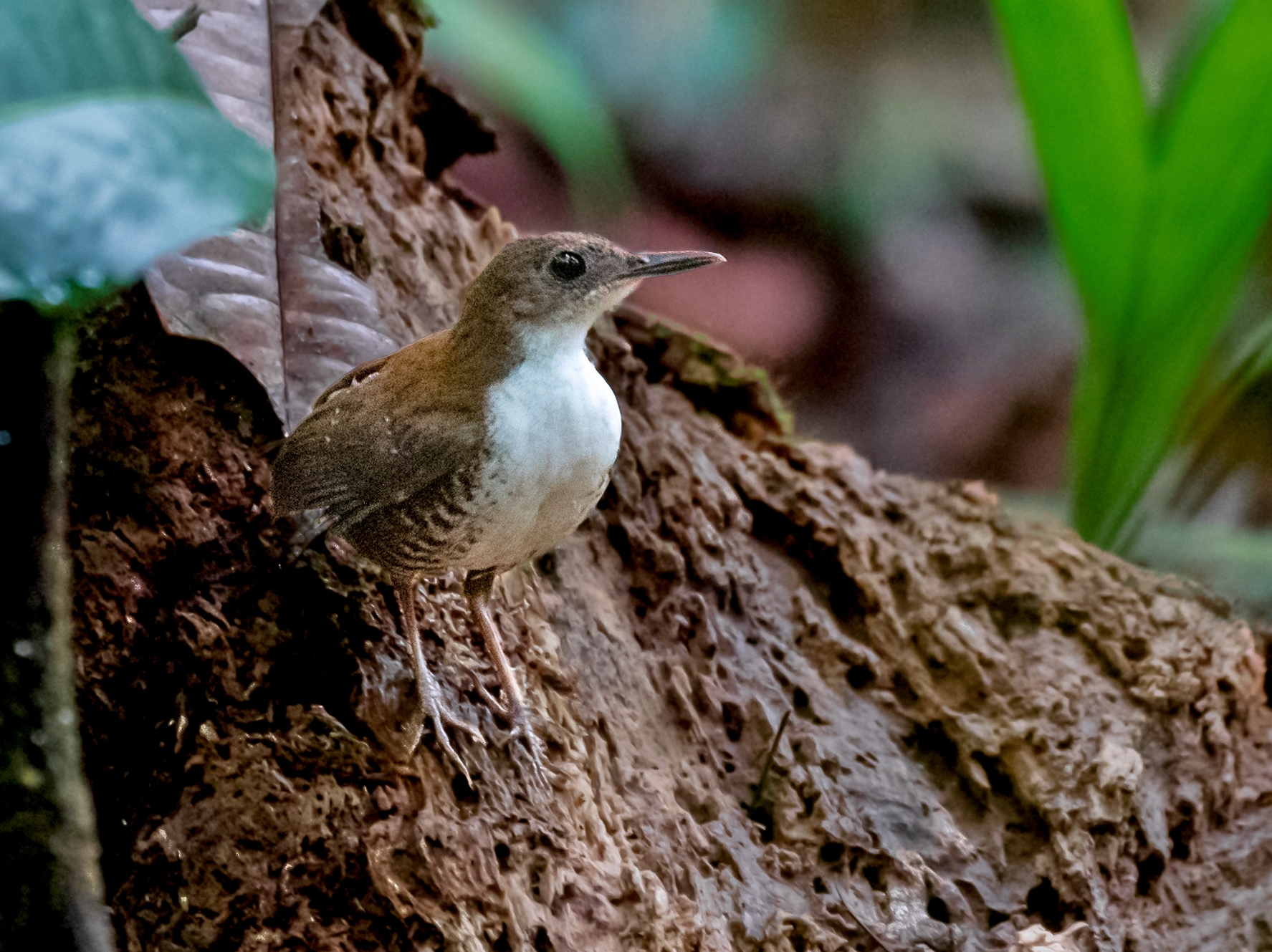
- From Careiro, Amazonas, Brazil

Conservation status
- Least Concern (IUCN 3.1)

Scientific classification
- Domain: Eukaryota
- Kingdom: Animalia
- Phylum: Chordata
- Class: Aves
- Order: Passeriformes
- Family: Troglodytidae
- Genus: Microcerculus
- Species: M. marginatus

Binomial name
- Microcerculus marginatus (PL Sclater, 1855)

= Southern nightingale-wren =

Species of bird

The southern nightingale-wren (Microcerculus marginatus), also known as the scaly-breasted wren, is a species of bird in the family Troglodytidae. It is found in Bolivia, Brazil, Colombia, Costa Rica, Ecuador, Panama, Peru, and Venezuela.

== Taxonomy and systematics ==
The southern nightingale-wren forms a species pair with the northern nightingale-wren (Microcerculus philomela) and was in the past considered conspecific with it. It is currently treated as a species in its own right by the International Ornithological Committee (IOC) and the Clements taxonomy, though under different English names.

The southern nightingale-wren has the six subspecies listed below. Subspecies M. m. luscinia is treated by some taxonomists as a separate species. The nominate subspecies M. m. marginatus is also sometimes considered a separate species or even two species divided by the Amazon River.

The southern nightingale-wren's subspecies are:

- M. m. luscinia Salvin (1866)
- M. m. corrasus Bangs (1902)
- M. m. squamulatus Sclater & Salvin (1875)
- M. m. occidentalis Hellmayr (1906)
- M. m. taeniatus Salvin (1881)
- M. m. marginatus Sclater (1855)

== Description ==
The southern nightingale-wren is 11 cm (4.3 in) long; males weigh 18.2 to 22 g (0.64 to 0.78 oz) and females 17 to 18 g (0.60 to 0.63 oz). Adults of the nominate subspecies have a dull gray-brown face and deep chocolate-brown crown and upperparts with a reddish tinge on the rump. They have a very short dark chocolate tail. Their chin, chest, and upper belly are white with some black scalloping on the sides of the chest. The lower flanks and lower belly are dark chocolate. The juvenile is similar with the addition of darkish barring on the crown and back and dark brown feather tips on the underside.

M. m. squamulatus is similar to the nominate but has scaly markings on the underparts. M. m. taeniatus also has scaly underparts and a more extensive reddish tinge on the upperparts and blackish barring below. M. m. corrasus is also similar to the nominate, but is a purer white below with narrow dark bars. M. m. occidentalis has a longer and thinner bill, darker upperparts and flanks, and broad dark bars on its abdomen. M. m. luscinia's throat is pale gray that becomes brownish gray on the breast and belly.

== Distribution and habitat ==
The subspecies of southern nightingale-wren are found thus:

- M. m. luscinia, central Costa Rica to Panama's eastern Darién Province
- M. m. corrasus, Santa Marta region of northern Colombia
- M. m. squamulatus, northern Colombia except Santa Marta into northern Venezuela
- M. m. occidentalis, western Colombia and northwestern Ecuador
- M. m. taeniatus, western Ecuador
- M. m. marginatus, throughout Amazonia, from Venezuela, Ecuador, Colombia, Peru, and Bolivia to near the mouth of the river in Brazil

The southern nightingale-wren inhabits the lower levels of dense humid tropical forest. It has been recorded from sea level to 1,700 m (5,600 ft) in Costa Rica, to 1,400 m (4,600 ft) in Colombia, and to 1,800 m (5,900 ft) in Venezuela. There is also one record in Panama at 3,100 m (10,200 ft).

== Behavior ==
=== Feeding ===
The southern nightingale-wren usually forages alone, on the ground and low in the understory. Little is known about its diet. It has been observed following army ant swarms in Central America but apparently does not do so routinely.

=== Breeding ===
Most of the data on the southern nightingale-wren's breeding phenology was recorded in Panama. Reports of active nests, fledged young, and adults in breeding condition indicate almost year-round breeding activity. Two nests have been described; they were constructed of leaves at the end of burrows that were probably excavated by other species of birds. One had two eggs and the other three.

=== Vocalization ===
The songs of the southern nightingale-wren differ geographically. Those in Central America to western Amazonia are long complex series of short notes followed by several whistles. Those in Peru and Bolivia are " clear, pure notes given at random" with varying pitch, length, and volume.

== Status ==
The IUCN has assessed the southern nightingale-wren as being of Least Concern. It "appears to be well distributed in much of its range" and occurs in several preserves and national parks.
