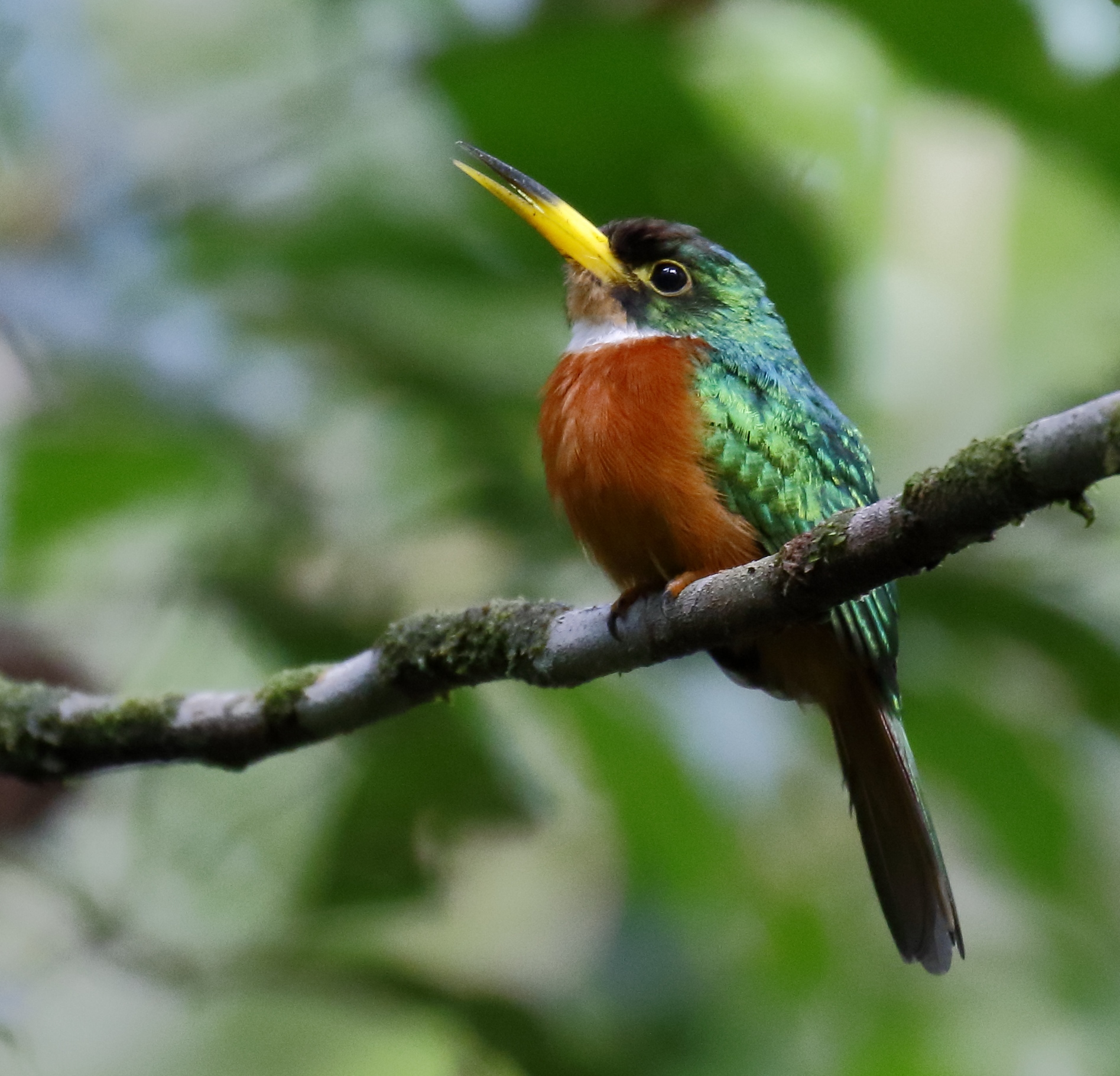
- A male yellow-billed jacamar at Presidente Figueiredo, Amazonas state, Brazil

Conservation status
- Least Concern (IUCN 3.1)

Scientific classification
- Kingdom: Animalia
- Phylum: Chordata
- Class: Aves
- Order: Piciformes
- Family: Galbulidae
- Genus: Galbula
- Species: G. albirostris

Binomial name
- Galbula albirostris Latham, 1790

= Yellow-billed jacamar =

Species of bird

The yellow-billed jacamar (Galbula albirostris) is a species of bird in the family Galbulidae. It is found in Brazil, Colombia, Ecuador, French Guiana, Guyana, Peru, Suriname, and Venezuela.

== Taxonomy and systematics ==
The yellow-billed jacamar was placed in its own genus, Pslilpornis, in the early 20th century; that genus was merged into Galbula by the middle of the century. It and the blue-necked jacamar (Galbula cyanicollis) were later considered conspecific but have been treated as a superspecies since approximately 1974. The yellow-billed jacamar has two subspecies, the nominate Galbula albirostris albirostris and G. a. chalcocephala.

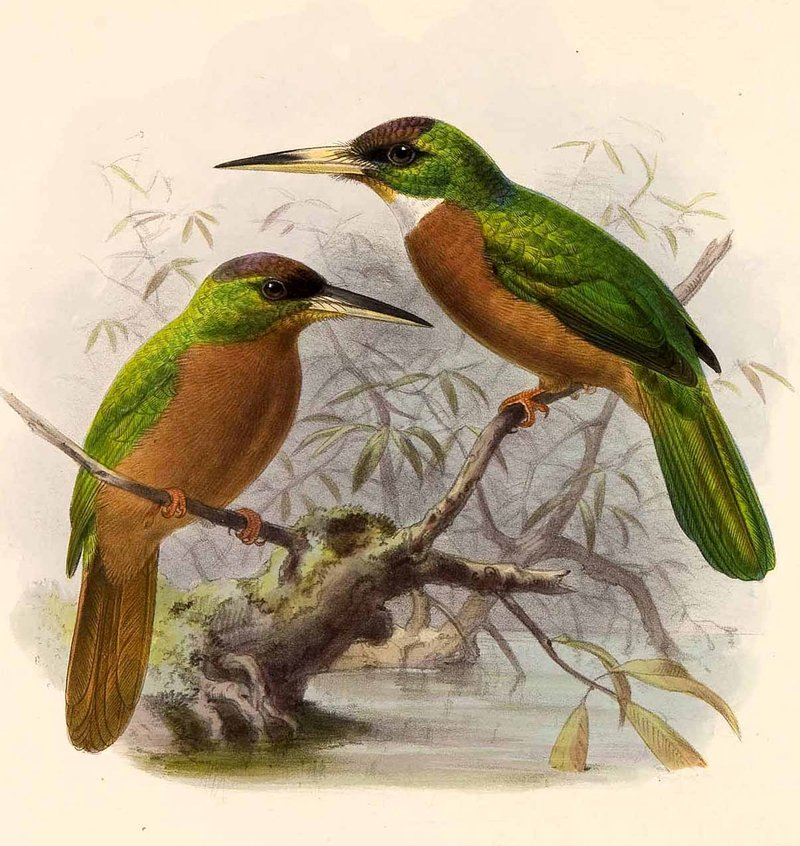
Female (left) and male (right), illustration by Keulemans

== Description ==
The nominate yellow-billed jacamar is 18 to 21 cm (7.1 to 8.3 in) long and weighs 16 to 24 g (0.56 to 0.85 oz). The male's crown is glossy copper or purplish and the rest of the upper parts are emerald green. The chin is buff, the throat white, and the rest of the underparts are pale reddish cinnamon. The female has paler underparts and a reddish buff throat.

Subspecies G. a. chalcocephala is also 18 to 21 cm (7.1 to 8.3 in) long but a little lighter, weighing 16.9 to 22.9 g (0.60 to 0.81 oz). Compared to the nominate, its crown is bronzy purple and its back a darker bronzy green. The chin is darker and the reddish cinnamon of the underparts is richer. The male's throat is the same white but the female's is reddish cinnamon.

== Distribution and habitat ==
Both subspecies of yellow-billed jacamar occur east of the Andes and north of the Amazon River. The nominate subspecies is found from eastern Colombia's Meta Department through southern and eastern Venezuela into the Guianas and south into northern Brazil. G. a. chalcocephala is found along the upper Orinoco River in southern Venezuela south through southeastern Colombia, eastern Ecuador, and western Brazil to northeastern Peru.

The preferred habitats of the two subspecies differ somewhat. The nominate inhabits terra firme, várzea, and igapó forests, both primary and secondary. Unlike may other jacamars, it is found primarily in the forest interior rather than its edges, but does frequent openings like clearings and treefalls. It also can be found in gallery forest and sandy coastal forest. Though it has been recorded as high as 1,300 m (4,300 ft), it is usually below 900 m (3,000 ft). In general, G. a. chalcocephala has similar requirements, but in Ecuador and Peru it seems to occur only in terra firme forest. In elevation it has been recorded to 400 m (1,300 ft) in Ecuador and to 800 m (2,600 ft) in Peru.

== Behavior ==
=== Feeding ===
The yellow-billed jacamar's diet is a large variety of insects. It perches on exposed branches in the canopy, typically in pairs, and sallies from there to catch its flying prey. It also joins mixed-species foraging flocks.

=== Breeding ===
Nest burrows of the nominate yellow-billed jacamar have been recorded in arboreal termite nests, and it is assumed to burrow into earth banks as well, like most other jacamars. The nominate nests during the dry season (June to November). Nothing is known about the breeding phenology of G. a. chalcocephala.

=== Vocalization ===
The yellow-billed jacamar's song is "a high-pitched 'peea peea-pee-pee-te-t-t-e'e'e'e'e'e' or 'peea-pee-pee-te-t-t-t't't't't'ttttt'r'" ending in a rattle. Its calls are described as "a sharp 'peek', 'tew' and 'trra'", sometimes in a series.

== Status ==
The IUCN has assessed the yellow-billed jacamar as being of Least Concern. However, "it is presumably sensitive to deforestation and other types of habitat destruction."
