= François Sumichrast =

Swiss-Mexican naturalist

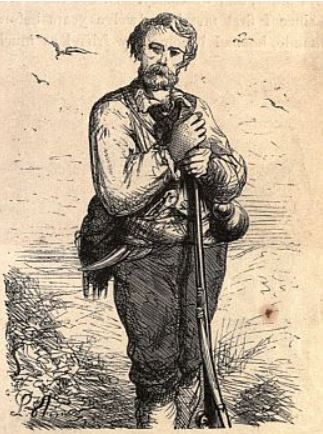
- Sumichrast on an 1864 expedition in Mexico, as depicted in "Adventures of a Young Naturalist" by Lucien Biart
- Born: 15 October 1828; Yvorne, Vaud, Switzerland
- Died: 26 September 1882 (aged 53); Chiapas, Mexico
- Known for: Collecting museum specimens, identifying new species in Mexico
- Scientific career
- Fields: Zoology

Adrien Louis Jean François Sumichrast (15 October 1828 — 26 September 1882) was a Swiss-Mexican naturalist and zoologist. Working mostly in Mexico, he collected specimens for museums and published descriptions of birds, mammals, amphibians, and reptiles. He is commemorated in the names of several taxa including Sumichrast's wren and Sumichrast's garter snake.

== Early life ==
Adrien Louis Jean François Sumichrast was born on 15 October 1828 in Yvorne, Vaud, Switzerland. He studied in Lausanne, Geneva, and Bern, and became interested in natural history from an early age. Feeling unsatisfied with the organisms available to study in Europe, Sumichrast departed for the old-growth forests of Mexico.

== Career ==
In 1854, another Swiss naturalist, Henri Louis Frédéric de Saussure, set out for an expedition across the West Indies and Mexico, for which he invited Sumichrast. The expedition was financed by Henri Peyrot, who joined the expedition alongside Saussure's gardener Marc Grosjean. Sumichrast joined them for legs of the voyage in the West Indies and Mexico. They followed the advice and strategies of Alexander von Humboldt, studying geology and volcanology in addition to natural history. They visited Jamaica, Haiti, and Cuba before arriving in Mexico in March 1855.

In April 1855, Sumichrast and the other expedition members arrived in Veracruz, and went to Cordoba where they stayed at Tospam, the estate of entomologist Auguste Sallé, who was setting off to explore the surrounding mountains with Adolphe Boucard. They stayed only a short time and continued on to other towns of the Mexican interior, including Orizaba, Puebla, Mexico City, and Tampico. Sumichrast and Saussure stayed in Mexico for about a year, during which they made large collections.

The travels through Mexico were dangerous due to civil conflict following the Mexican-American War and the 1855 overthrow by the Liberal Party of President Antonio López de Santa Anna, which eventually led to the Reform War. As the expedition became more dangerous, and the war seemed to approach, Saussure became increasingly displeased with Mexico, reporting he wished he had chosen Ecuador instead. Saussure, Peyrot, and Grosjean cut the trip short and returned to Geneva in 1856 by way of the United States, taking the specimens with them. Sumichrast remained behind in Mexico.

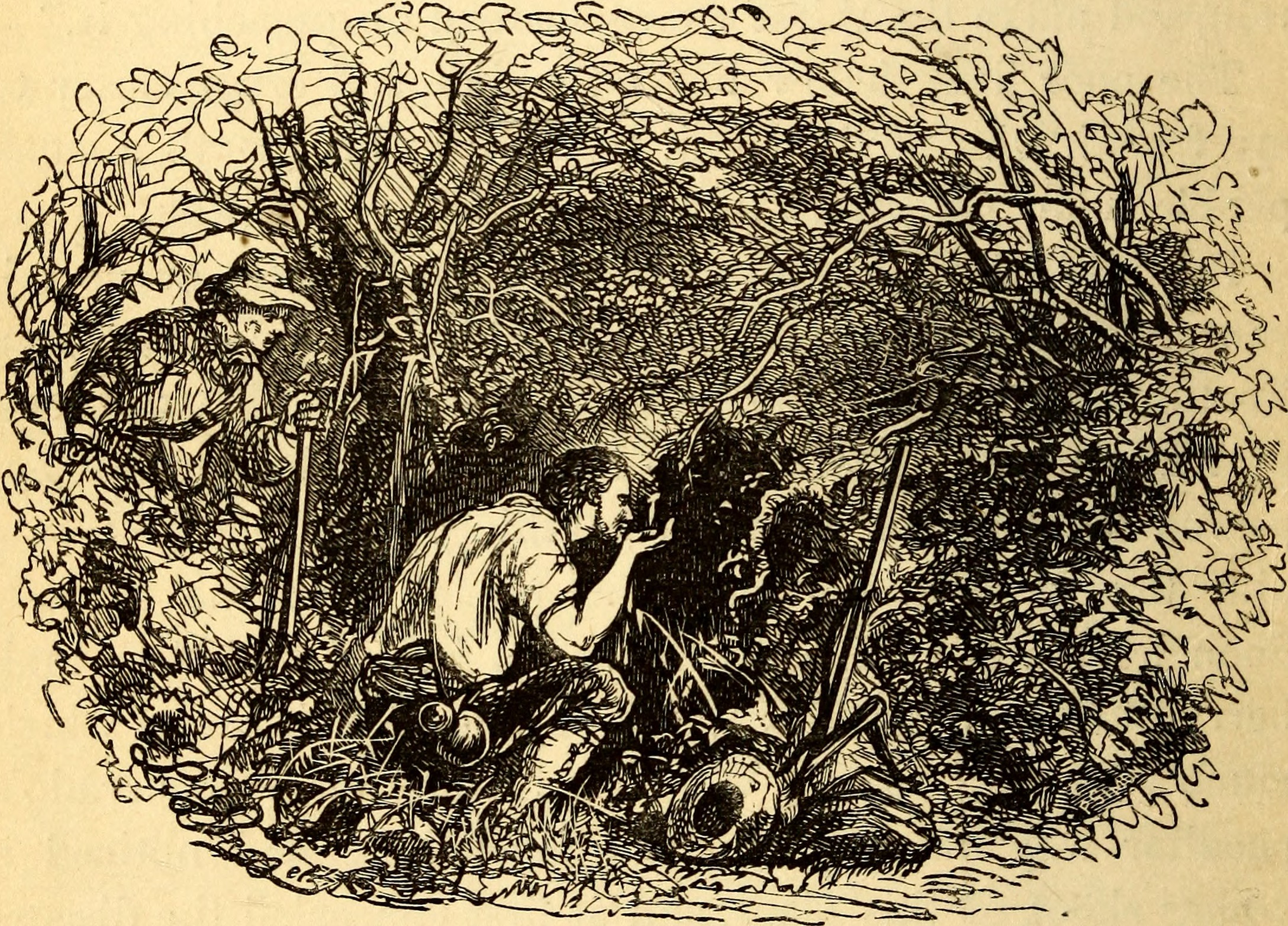
Sumichrast discovering a spring, from "Adventures of a Young Naturalist" by Lucien Biart

Sumichrast lived in Orizaba in the 1860s. He collected specimens across Veracruz, State of Mexico, Oaxaca, Tehuantepec, and Chiapas. It is unclear but possible that he took Mexican nationality, as he lived in Mexico most his life, but Mexican sources refer to his nationality as Swiss, and American museums he did business with incorrectly acted under the impression he was French.

He obtained funding to lead an expedition from the Smithsonian Institution. In 1870, he applied to Spencer Fullerton Baird, curator of the Smithsonian's National Museum of Natural History, for funding to lead a second expedition in Mexico, but Baird refused him. Nonetheless, he continued to collect specimens under the auspices of the Smithsonian. He also continued to cooperate with Saussure, sending specimens to him in Geneva.

He moved from Orizaba to the Pacific Slope, on the Isthmus of Tehuantepec, where he worked into the 1880s. On April 1, 1882, he sent a letter to Boucard stating his intention to create a complete collection of reptiles for the Agassiz Museum of Comparative Zoology in Cambridge, Massachusetts, and to make a trip to Europe with his family to visit Boucard for the end of the year. However, while still in Mexico, Sumichrast became infected with cholera and died on 26 September 1882.

== Collections ==
Sumichrast collected many specimens of reptiles, amphibians, birds, mammals, as well as insects, crustaceans, plants, minerals, and fossils. He had contacts in museums in Mexico, Switzerland, France, and the United States, sending specimens to other scholars including George Newbold Lawrence, Edward Drinker Cope, Matteo Botteri, and Joseph Charles Hippolyte Crosse, as well as Saussure and Boucard.

== Taxa named after Sumichrast ==
Birds:

- Sumichrast's wren (Hylorchilus sumichrasti)
- Cinnamon-tailed sparrow (Peucaea sumichrasti)
- Sumichrast's blackbird (Dives dives)
- Sumichrast's scrub jay (Aphelocoma (woodhouseii) sumichrasti)

Mammals:

- Sumichrast's vesper rat (Nyctomys sumichrasti)
- Sumichrast's harvest mouse (Reithrodontomys sumichrasti)
- Cacomistle (Bassariscus sumichrasti)

Reptiles:

- Sumichrast's garter snake (Thamnophis sumichrasti)
- Sumichrast's skink (Plestiodon sumichrasti)

Amphibians:

- Sumichrast's treefrog (Exerodonta sumichrasti)

Insects:

- Sumichrast's toothpick grasshopper (Achurum sumichrasti)
- Neivamyrmex sumichrasti
