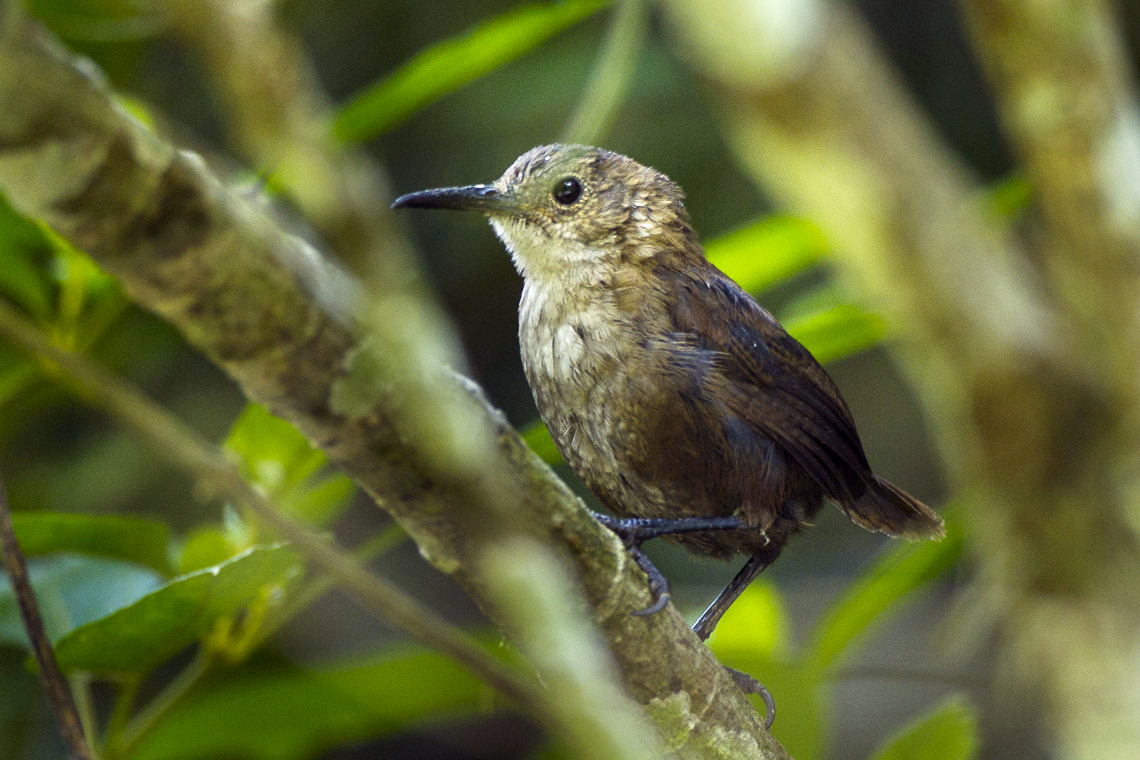

Conservation status
- Vulnerable (IUCN 3.1)

Scientific classification
- Domain: Eukaryota
- Kingdom: Animalia
- Phylum: Chordata
- Class: Aves
- Order: Passeriformes
- Family: Troglodytidae
- Genus: Hylorchilus
- Species: H. navai

Binomial name
- Hylorchilus navai Crossin & Ely, 1973

= Nava's wren =

Species of bird

Nava's wren (Hylorchilus navai) is a species of bird in the family Troglodytidae. It is endemic to Mexico.

== Taxonomy and systematics ==
Nava's wren was originally treated as a subspecies of Hylorchilus sumichrasti, which at that time was called slender-billed wren. After the split, the now-monotypic H. sumichrasti was renamed Sumichrast's wren. Nava's wren is also monotypic.

== Description ==
Nava's wren is 16 cm (6.3 in) long; a female weighed 29.3 g (1.03 oz). The adults have a rich brown crown and upperparts and a tawny face. Their throat and upper chest are whitish that transitions to pale gray on the lower chest and gray-brown at the vent. The lower chest has faint scalloping and the flanks are sooty brown.

== Distribution and habitat ==
Nava's wren occurs in a small area of southern Mexico, in southeastern Veracruz, western Chiapas, and barely into northeastern Oaxaca. It inhabits undisturbed forest with outcrops of Karst limestone between the elevations of 75 and 800 m (246 and 2,625 ft).

== Behavior ==
=== Feeding ===
Though no dietary data are available for Nava's wren, it probably feeds mostly or entirely on invertebrates. It forages on the ground, especially among rocks and on rock faces.

=== Breeding ===
The breeding phenology of Nava's wren has not been documented.

=== Vocalization ===
The male Nava's wren sings "a varied, often stuttering warble of mellow whistles" . The female's song is "an introductory note followed by rapid series of 8 or more loud whistles" . The species' call is "a metallic 'tink'" .

== Status ==
The IUCN has assessed Nava's wren as Vulnerable "owing to its small and declining range" and that its population is estimated to be fewer than 7000 adults.
