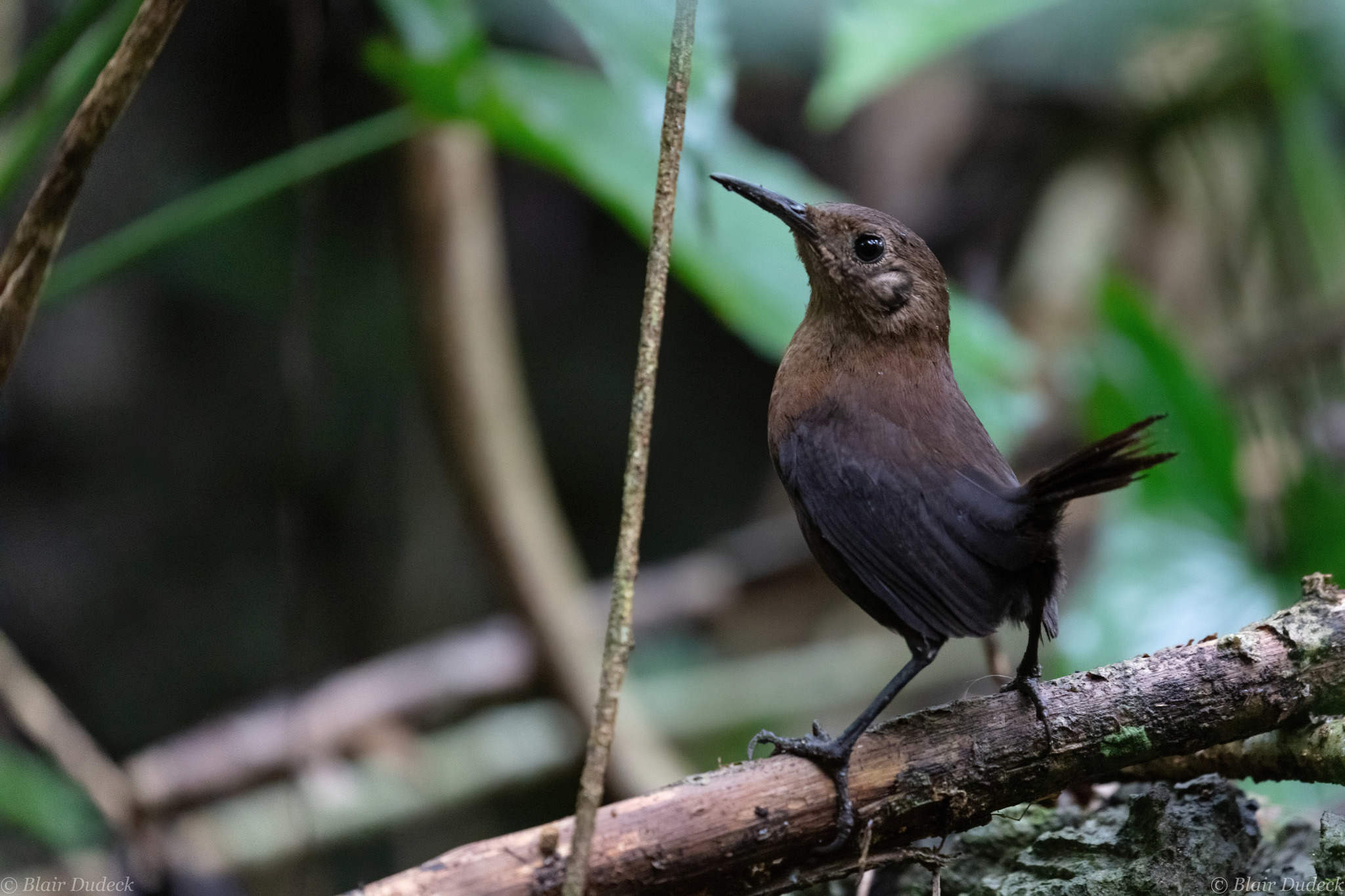

Conservation status
- Near Threatened (IUCN 3.1)

Scientific classification
- Kingdom: Animalia
- Phylum: Chordata
- Class: Aves
- Order: Passeriformes
- Family: Troglodytidae
- Genus: Hylorchilus
- Species: H. sumichrasti

Binomial name
- Hylorchilus sumichrasti (Lawrence, 1871)

= Sumichrast's wren =

Species of bird

Sumichrast's wren (Hylorchilus sumichrasti), also known as the slender-billed wren, is a species of bird in the family Troglodytidae. It is endemic to Mexico.

== Taxonomy and systematics ==
Sumichrast's wren is monotypic. A former subspecies, Hylorchilus sumichrasti navai was elevated to species status as Nava's wren in the 1990s.

The common name of this species commemorates the Mexican naturalist François Sumichrast.

== Description ==
Sumichrast's wren is 15 to 16.5 cm (5.9 to 6.5 in) long; a female weighed 28.4 g (1.00 oz). The adults have uniform deep brown crowns, napes, and backs; their rumps are a sooty brown. Their chin and throat are buff that deepens through the breast into the flanks and belly. The breast has faint dark bars and the belly has tiny white dots. The juvenile is similar, but its throat has a dirty look and faint dusky scales, its underparts are darker, and the breast and belly markings are fainter.

== Distribution and habitat ==
Sumichrast's wren occurs in a small area of Mexico, from central Veracruz into northern Oaxaca. It inhabits the understory of humid forest, both evergreen and semi-deciduous, and also shady coffee plantations. However, it is found only in scattered sites that have extensive limestone outcroppings. In elevation it ranges from 75 to 1,000 m (246 to 3,281 ft).

== Behavior ==
=== Feeding ===
The diet of Sumichrast's wren is primarily arthropods and other invertebrates such as snails and worms, and also includes small fruit as a minor component. It forages on and very near the ground with hops and short flights, probing into crevices for prey and occasionally snatching a flying insect that passes it.

=== Breeding ===
Active Sumichrast's wren nests have been found in May. The nest is a cup made of grass, roots, and other materials and placed in a cave or crevice. Both sexes provide the materials but only the female builds it. The clutch size is three. The male brings food to the female during incubation and both sexes provision nestlings.

=== Vocalization ===
The male Sumichrast's wren sings "a varied descending series of loud, rich whistles" . The female sings "a simple phrase consisting of a single repeated syllable". One of its calls is .

== Status ==
The IUCN has assessed Sumichrast's wren as Near Threatened. "This species has a small range and a moderately small population. Both its range and population are probably in decline owing to increasing habitat loss and degradation."
