= Sumichrast's garter snake =

Conservation status
- Least Concern (IUCN 3.1)

Scientific classification
- Kingdom: Animalia
- Phylum: Chordata
- Class: Reptilia
- Order: Squamata
- Suborder: Serpentes
- Family: Colubridae
- Genus: Thamnophis
- Species: T. sumichrasti

Binomial name
- Thamnophis sumichrasti (Cope, 1866)

Synonyms
- Eutaenia sumichrasti Cope, 1866; Eutaenia phenax Cope, 1868; Thamnophis haliophis Taylor, 1940; Thamnophis phenax halophilus — H.M. Smith, 1942; Thamnophis sumichrasti — Liner, 1994

Species of snake

Sumichrast's garter snake (Thamnophis sumichrasti) is a species of snake in the family Colubridae. The species is endemic to Mexico.

== Etymology ==
The specific name sumichrasti is in honor of the Swiss-born Mexican naturalist Adrien Jean Louis François Sumichrast (1828–1882).

== Geographic range ==
Thamnophis sumichrasti is found in the Mexican states of Chiapas, Hidalgo, Oaxaca, Puebla, Querétaro, San Luis Potosí, Tabasco, and Veracruz.

== Habitat ==
The preferred natural habitats of T. sumichrasti are freshwater wetlands and forest.

== Reproduction ==
T. sumichrasti is viviparous.
