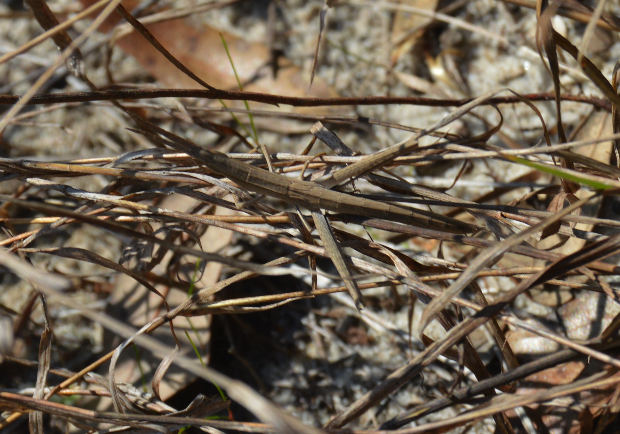

Scientific classification
- Kingdom: Animalia
- Phylum: Arthropoda
- Clade: Pancrustacea
- Class: Insecta
- Order: Orthoptera
- Suborder: Caelifera
- Family: Acrididae
- Tribe: Mermiriini
- Genus: Achurum
- Species: A. carinatum

Binomial name
- Achurum carinatum (F. Walker, 1870)

= Achurum carinatum =

Species of grasshopper

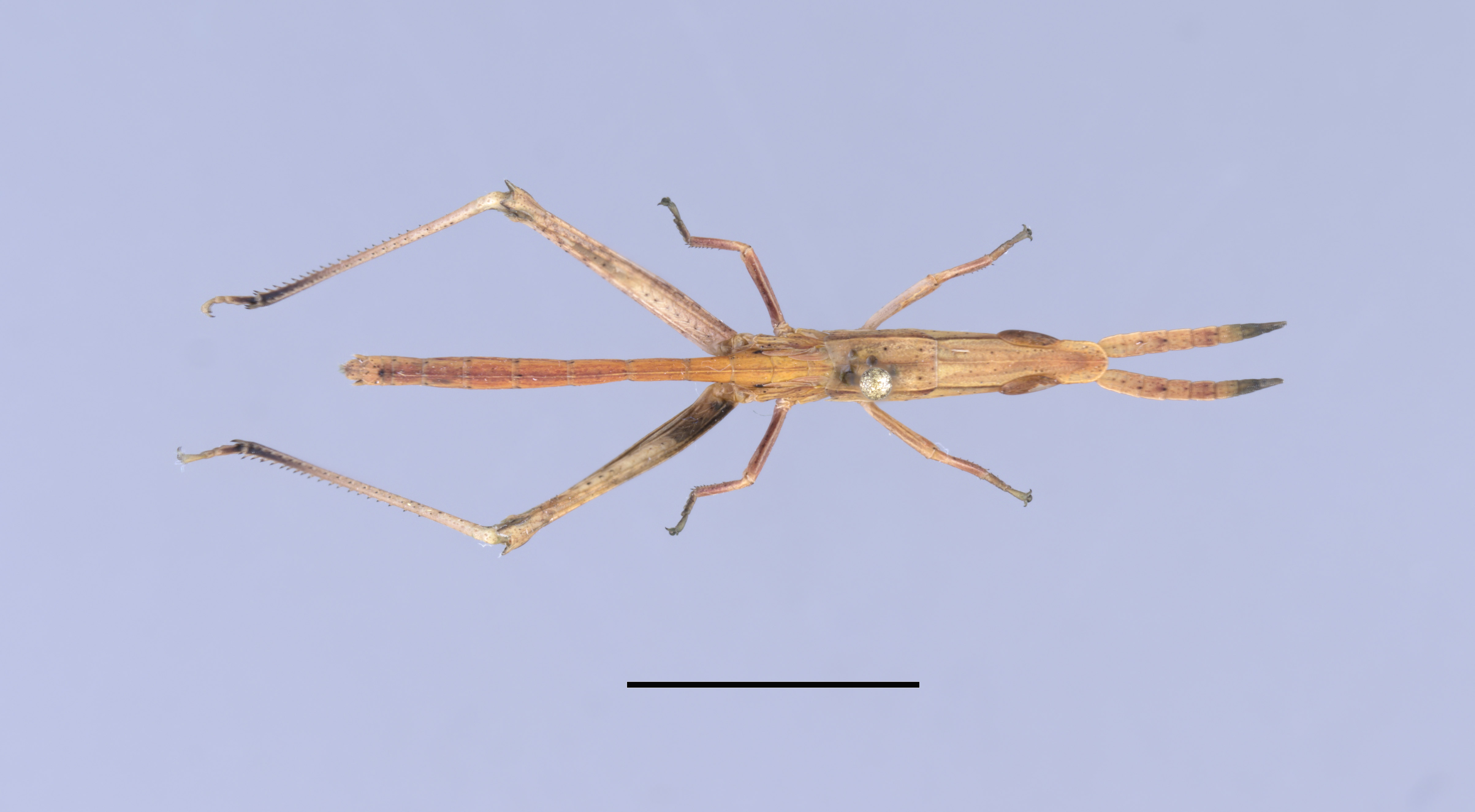
Figure 1. Dorsal view of Achurum carinatum Walker, 1870 collected by S. Irons from Cedar Creek WMA, GA (October 16, 2024). Scale bar is 1 cm.

Achurum carinatum, the long-headed toothpick grasshopper, is a species of slant-faced grasshopper in the family Acrididae. It is found in North America.

The Longheaded Toothpick Grasshopper is a small, cryptic grasshopper of the family Acrididae (subfamily Gomphocerinae) that is native to the southeast United States. These grasshoppers resemble the grasses in which they're found, with long, slender bodies, slanted faces, flat antennae, and reduced wings. These grasshoppers are flightless and have some variation in color, some having green or even black spots.

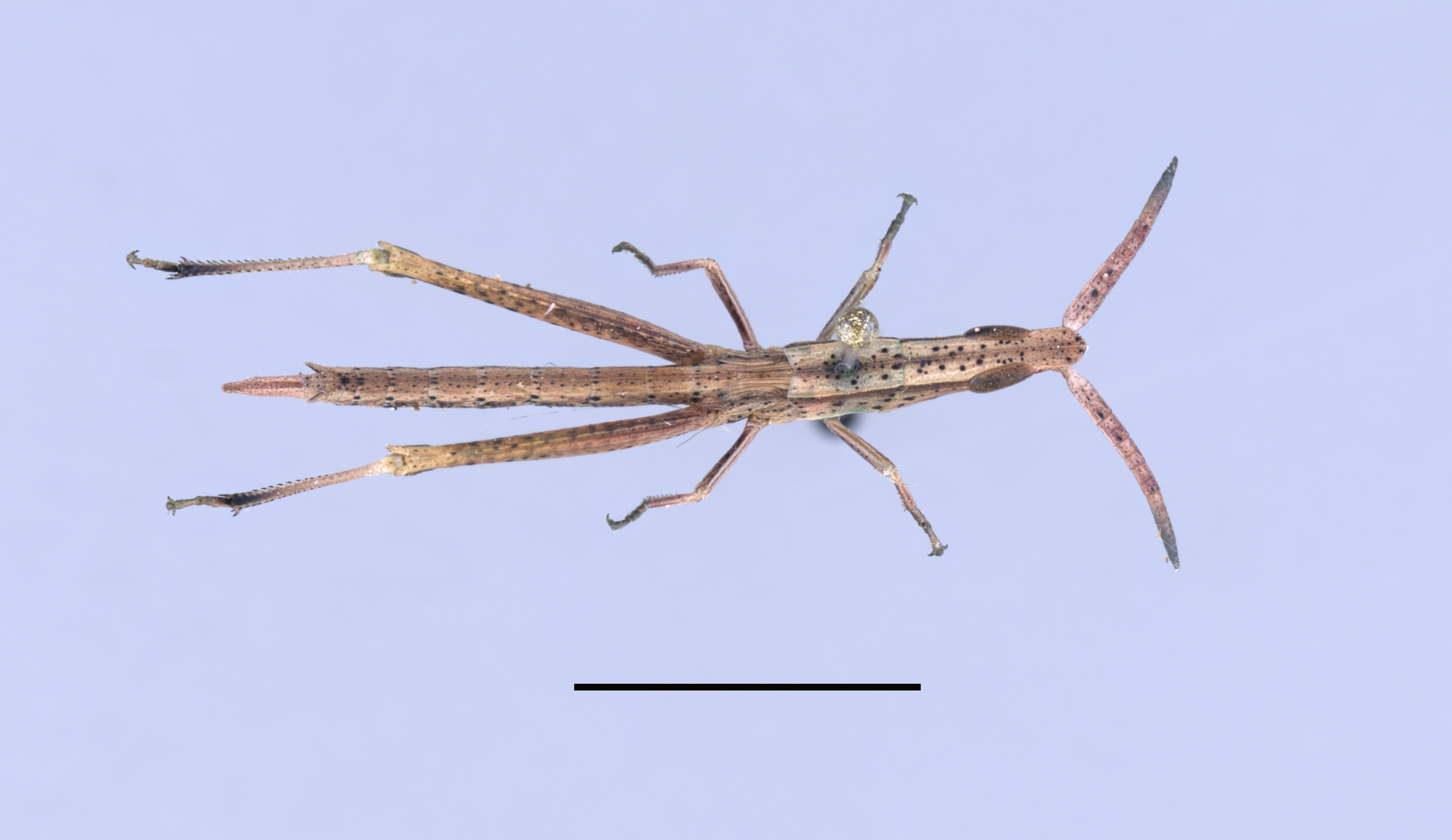
Figure 2. Dorsal view of Achurum carinatum Walker, 1870 collected on October 25th 2024 from Andalusia Farm, Milledgeville, GA, USA. Identified to the Family Acrididae within the Order Orthoptera. Scale bar is 1 cm.

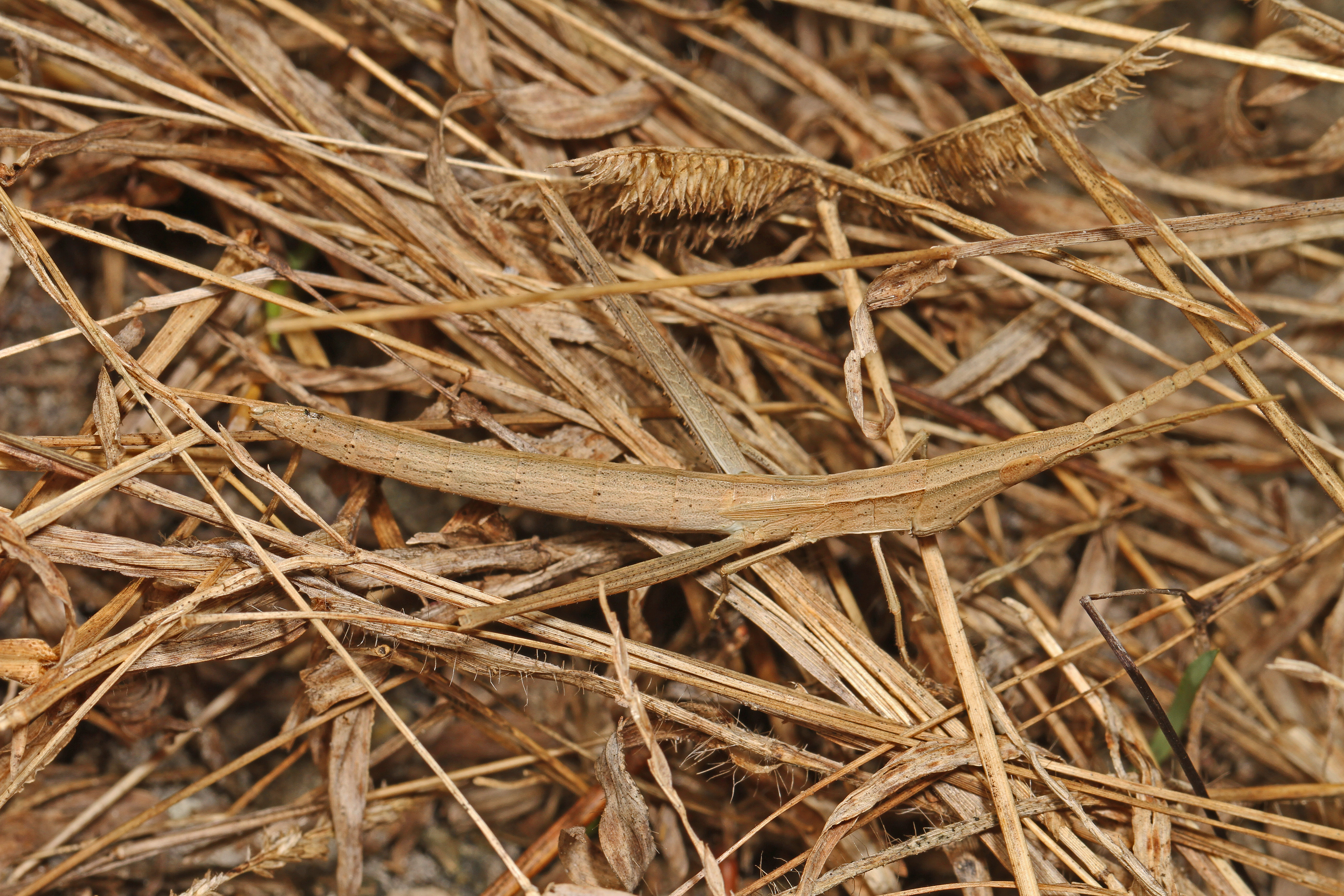
Long-headed toothpick grasshopper, Achurum carinatum

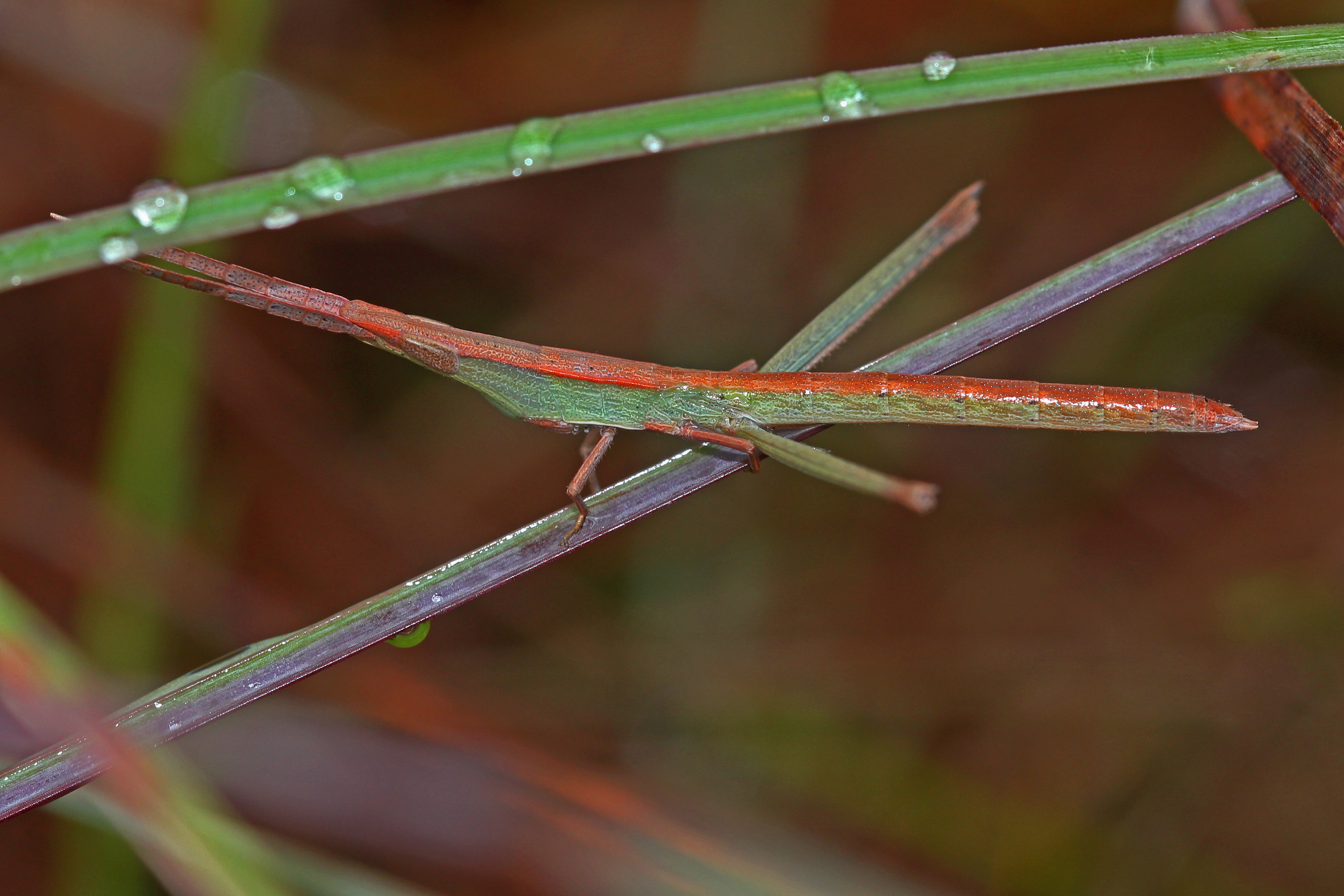
Long-headed toothpick grasshopper, Achurum carinatum
