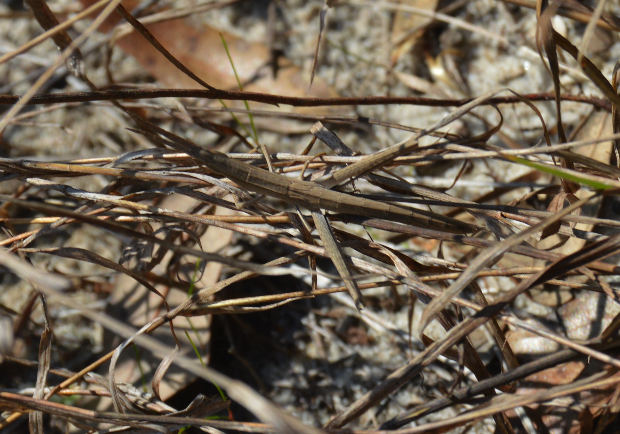
- Achurum carinatum

Scientific classification
- Domain: Eukaryota
- Kingdom: Animalia
- Phylum: Arthropoda
- Class: Insecta
- Order: Orthoptera
- Suborder: Caelifera
- Family: Acrididae
- Tribe: Mermiriini
- Genus: Achurum; Saussure, 1861

= Achurum =

Genus of grasshoppers

Achurum is a genus of slant-faced grasshoppers in the family Acrididae. There are at least three described species in Achurum.

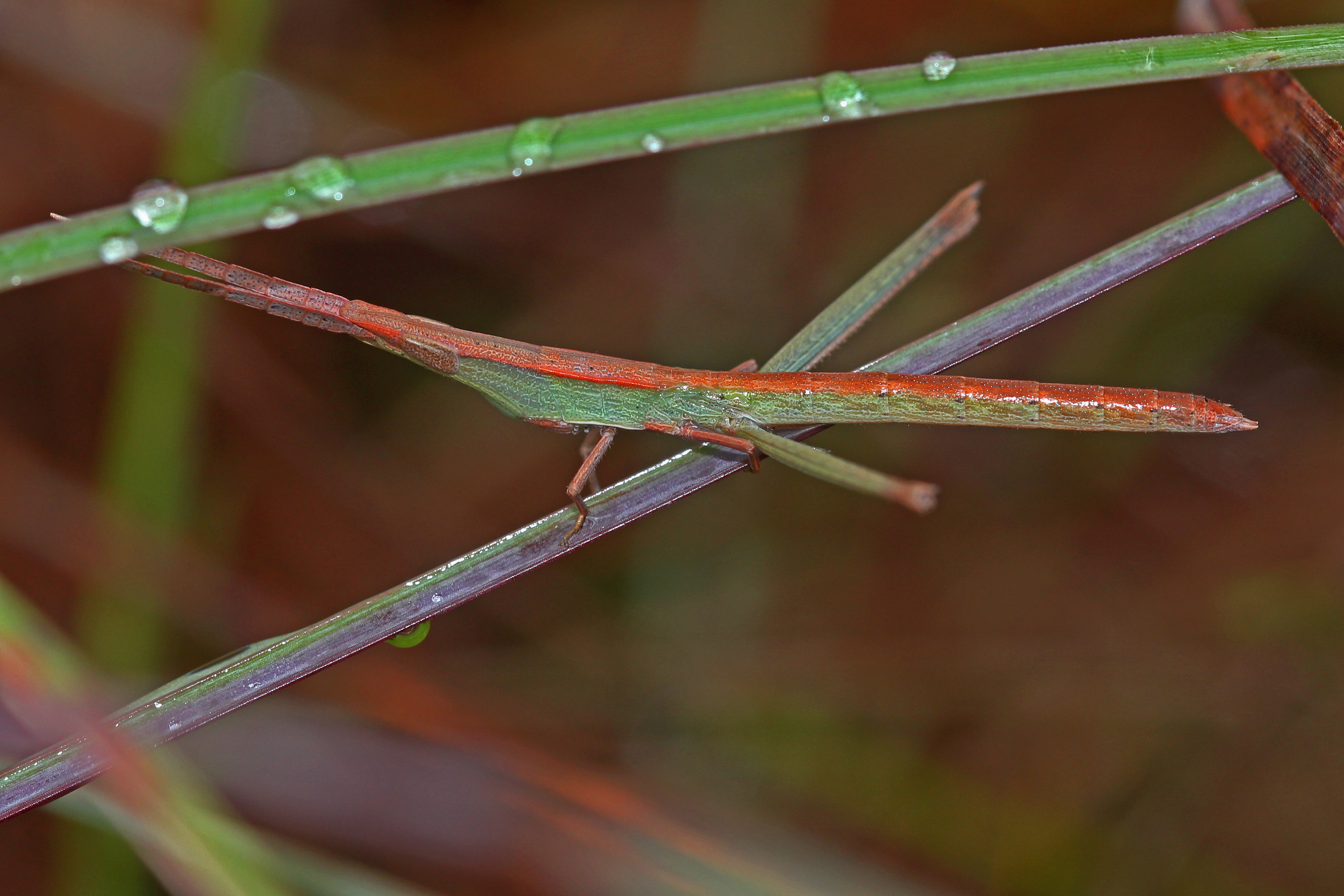
Achurum carinatum

== Species ==
- Achurum carinatum (Walker, 1870) (long-headed toothpick grasshopper)
- Achurum minimipenne Caudell, 1904 (tamaulipan toothpick grasshopper)
- Achurum sumichrasti (Saussure, 1861) (sumichrast toothpick grasshopper)
