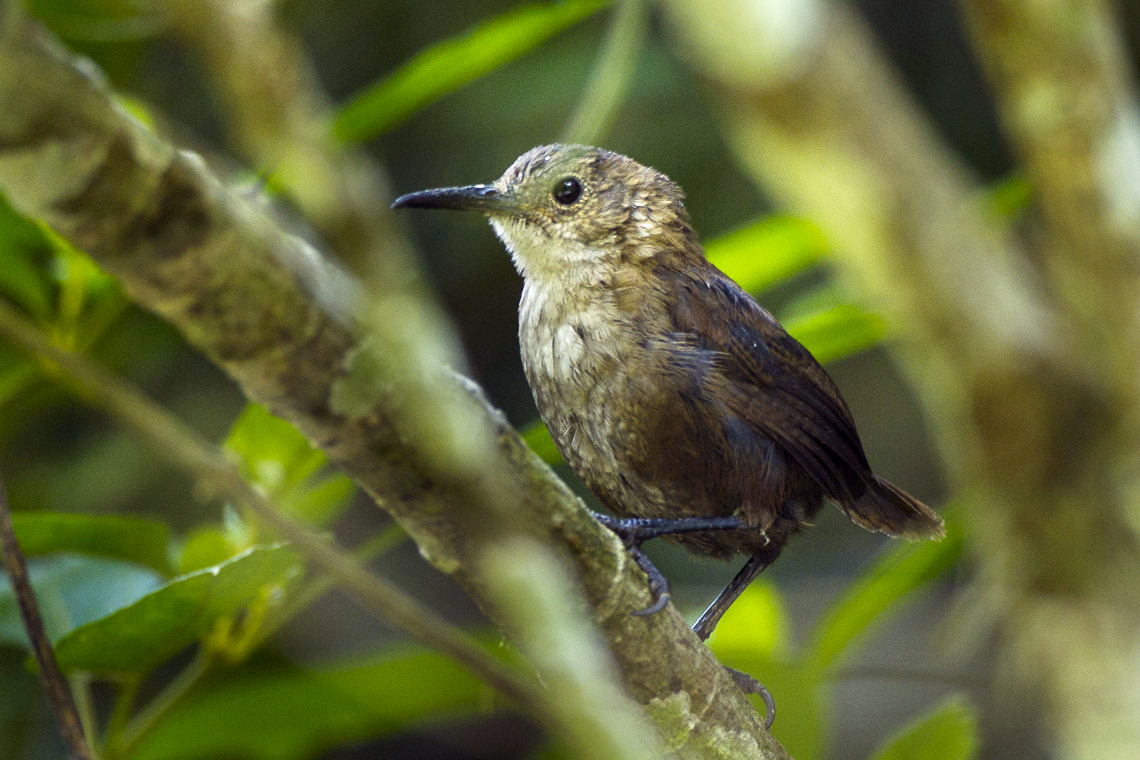
- Nava's wren (Hylorchilus navai)

Scientific classification
- Kingdom: Animalia
- Phylum: Chordata
- Class: Aves
- Order: Passeriformes
- Family: Troglodytidae
- Genus: Hylorchilus; Nelson, 1897

Type species
- Catherpes sumichrasti Lawrence, 1871

= Hylorchilus =

Genus of birds

Hylorchilus is a genus of bird in the family Troglodytidae. It contains the following two species:

Image	Common name	Scientific name
	Nava's wren	Hylorchilus navai
	Sumichrast's wren	Hylorchilus sumichrasti
