= Achurum sumichrasti =

Scientific classification
- Domain: Eukaryota
- Kingdom: Animalia
- Phylum: Arthropoda
- Class: Insecta
- Order: Orthoptera
- Suborder: Caelifera
- Family: Acrididae
- Genus: Achurum
- Species: A. sumichrasti

Binomial name
- Achurum sumichrasti (Saussure, 1861)

Species of grasshopper

Achurum sumichrasti, the sumichrast toothpick grasshopper, is a species of slant-faced grasshopper in the family Acrididae. It is found in Central America and North America.
