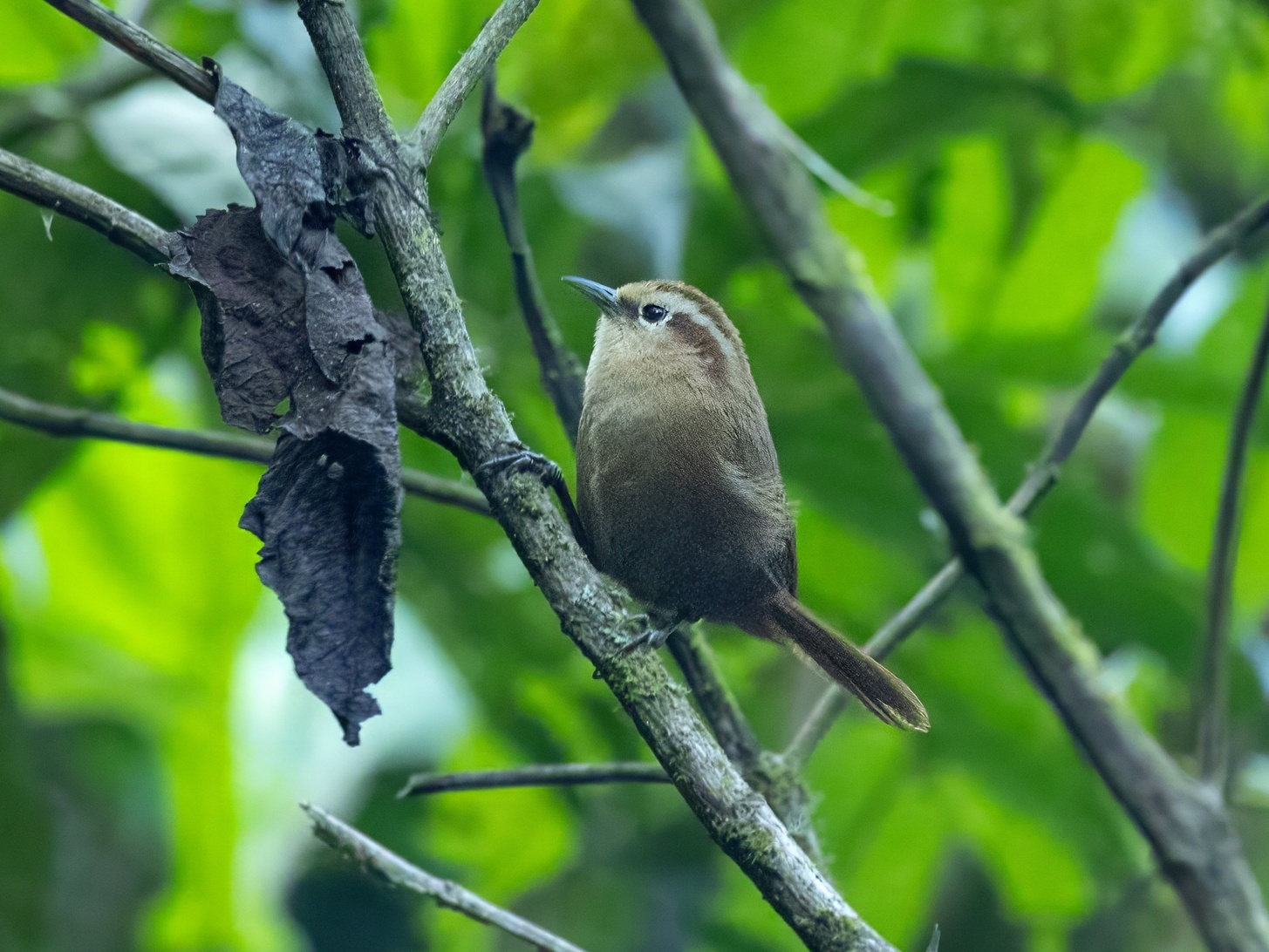

Conservation status
- Least Concern (IUCN 3.1)

Scientific classification
- Kingdom: Animalia
- Phylum: Chordata
- Class: Aves
- Order: Passeriformes
- Family: Troglodytidae
- Genus: Cinnycerthia
- Species: C. fulva

Binomial name
- Cinnycerthia fulva (P.L. Sclater, 1874)

Synonyms
- Thryophilus fulvus (protonym)

= Fulvous wren =

Species of bird

The fulvous wren (Cinnycerthia fulva) is a species of bird in the family Troglodytidae. It is found in Bolivia and Peru.

== Taxonomy and systematics ==
The fulvous wren was formerly considered a subspecies of Cinnycerthia peruana, which at that time was called the sepia-brown wren and is now called the Peruvian wren. Fulvous wren, Peruvian wren, and what is now called sepia-brown wren (C. olivascens) form a superspecies.

The fulvous wren has three subspecies, the nominate Cinnycerthia fulva fulva, C. f. fitzpatricki, and C. f. gravesi.

== Description ==
The fulvous wren is 14.5 cm (5.7 in) long; males weigh an average of 18.4 g (0.65 oz) and females weigh 14.8 g (0.52 oz). The nominate adults have a reddish brown crown and back that is redder on the rump. They have a buff supercilium, a dull brown eye stripe, and buffy cinnamon cheeks. The tail is also reddish brown, and has narrow blackish bars crossing it. The throat is buffy white, the chest buffy cinnamon darkening to reddish brown on the flanks and belly. C. f. fitzpatricki has a darker crown and a lighter supercilium than the nominate. C. f. gravesi has a whitish supercilium and its underparts are paler than those of the nominate. The immature is similar to the nominate adult but its crown is grayish.

== Distribution and habitat ==
The nominate fulvous wren is found in the eastern Andes of Peru, primarily in the Department of Cuzco. C. f. fitzpatricki is found in the Vilcabamba mountain range, which is also in Cuzco. C. f. gravesi is found from the southern Peru's Department of Puno south to the central Bolivia's Cochabamba Department. The species inhabits wet montane forest between 1,500 and 3,300 m (4,920 and 10,830 ft).

== Behavior ==
=== Feeding ===
The fulvous wren forages on the ground and in low vegetation, often in small flocks. Its diet has not been described.

=== Breeding ===
Virtually nothing is known about the fulvous wren's breeding phenology except that birds in breeding condition were documented in January in Bolivia.

=== Vocalization ===
The fulvous wren's song and calls have not been formally described. An example of each from Xeno-canto is and .

== Status ==
The IUCN has assessed the fulvous wren as being of Least Concern. "The global population size has not been quantified, but the species is described as fairly common at some locations, although generally poorly known".
