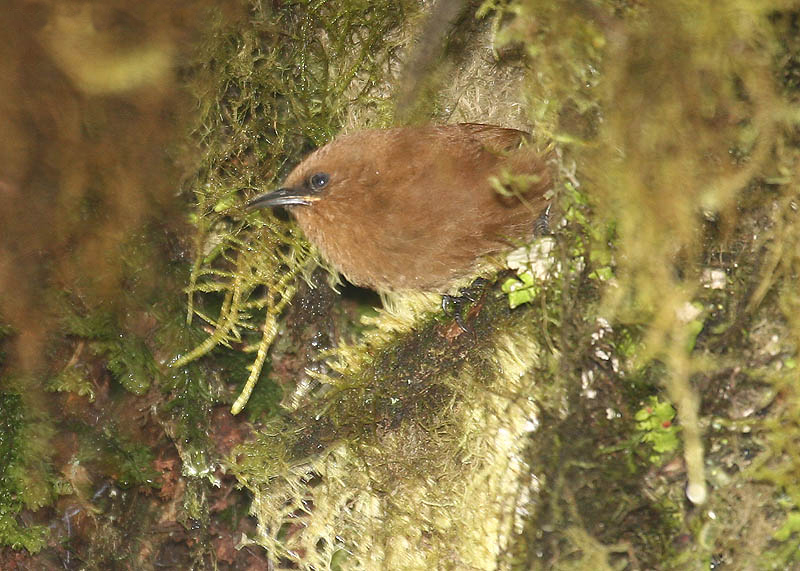
- Yanacocha Reserve, Ecuador

Conservation status
- Least Concern (IUCN 3.1)

Scientific classification
- Kingdom: Animalia
- Phylum: Chordata
- Class: Aves
- Order: Passeriformes
- Family: Troglodytidae
- Genus: Cinnycerthia
- Species: C. unirufa

Binomial name
- Cinnycerthia unirufa (Lafresnaye, 1840)

= Rufous wren =

Species of bird

The rufous wren (Cinnycerthia unirufa) is a species of bird in the family Troglodytidae. It is found in Colombia, Ecuador, Peru, and Venezuela. Its natural habitat is subtropical or tropical moist montane forests.

There are three subspecies:

- C. u. unirufa - northeastern Colombia and the extreme west of Venezuela
- C. u. unibrunnea - most of Colombia, Ecuador, and the extreme north of Peru
- C. u. chakei - the Perijá Mountains on the border of Colombia and Venezuela

== Description ==
The rufous wren has a length of about 16.5 cm (6.5 in). Birds in most of Colombia and in Ecuador are a uniform dark chestnut-brown colour with slight blackish barring on the wings and tail, though this is difficult to observe in the field. The lores are also blackish. Individuals in northeastern Colombia and in Venezuela are a slightly paler shade, especially on the crown. The rufous wren could be confused with the sepia-brown wren (Cinnycerthia olivascens), but that species is less rufous and has bolder barring on wings and tail. Another similar bird is the rufous spinetail (Synallaxis unirufa), but that species has a longer tail, has no barring on wings and tail and is altogether different in voice and habits.

== Distribution and habitat ==
The rufous wren is found in montane areas of northern Peru, Ecuador, Colombia and southwestern Venezuela at altitudes usually between 2,200 and 3,400 metres (7,200 and 11,200 ft). It occurs in dense undergrowth in tropical moist forests.

== Behaviour ==
The rufous wren is usually found in groups of a few individuals often joining other species of birds in small flocks. It flits about in the undergrowth and is often to be seen in and around clumps of Chusquea mountain bamboo. It has a complex and musical song consisting of repeated notes, trills and short phrases, and often sung in duets with other birds.

== Status ==
The International Union for Conservation of Nature has assessed the conservation status of the rufous wren as being of "least concern". This is because it has a very wide range and is said to be fairly common. It is possible that the population trend is downwards because of the destruction and fragmentation of its habitat, but it is thought not to be declining at such a rate as to justify putting it in a more threatened category.
