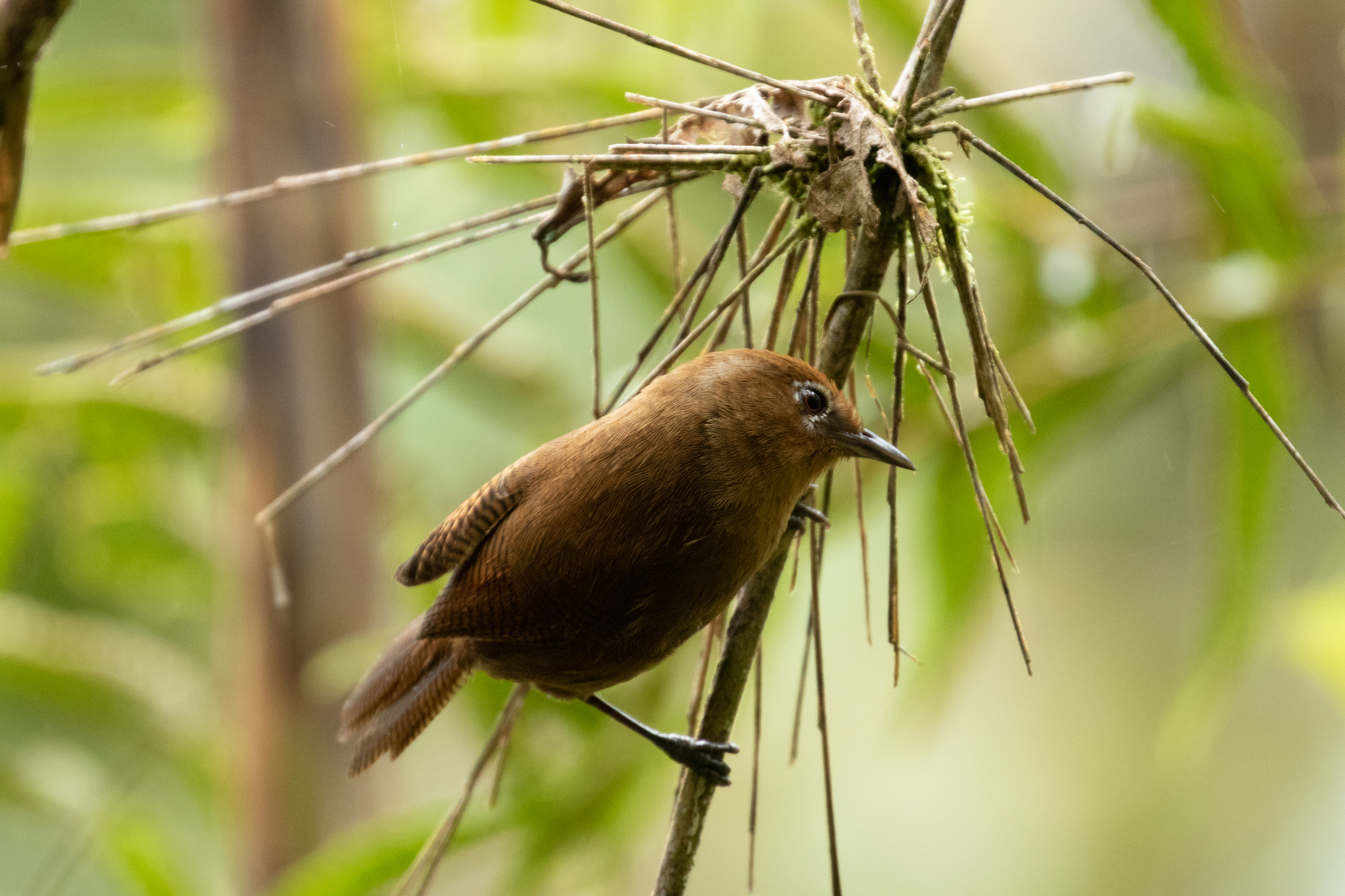

Conservation status
- Least Concern (IUCN 3.1)

Scientific classification
- Kingdom: Animalia
- Phylum: Chordata
- Class: Aves
- Order: Passeriformes
- Family: Troglodytidae
- Genus: Cinnycerthia
- Species: C. peruana

Binomial name
- Cinnycerthia peruana (Cabanis, 1873)

Synonyms
- Presbys peruanus (protonym)

= Peruvian wren =

Species of bird

The Peruvian wren (Cinnycerthia peruana) is a species of bird in the family Troglodytidae. It is endemic to Peru.

== Taxonomy and systematics ==
What is now the Peruvian wren was formerly called the sepia-brown wren and at that time included as subspecies what are now the species Cinnycerthia olivascens and C. fulva. Confusingly, after the split the name sepia-brown wren was transferred to C. olivascens by the International Ornithological Committee (IOC), but the South American Classification Committee of the American Ornithological Society (SACC/AOS) and the Clements taxonomy call it Sharpe's wren. C. fulva is named the fulvous wren.

The Peruvian wren is monotypic.

== Description ==
The Peruvian wren is 15.5 to 16 cm (6.1 to 6.3 in) long and weighs 19.6 g (0.69 oz). The adults' upperparts are rich chestnut, with the crown and rump being redder. They have a variable amount of white on the face. The tail is also rich chestnut and has narrow black bars. The chin and throat are orange-brown and the chest, belly, and flanks are the same hue but darker. The juvenile is believed to resemble the adult but with no white on the face.

== Distribution and habitat ==
The Peruvian wren is found in the Andes of Peru between the departments of Amazonas and Ayacucho. It inhabits wet montane forest, secondary forest, and their edges. In elevation it ranges from 1,500 to 3,300 m (4,900 to 10,800 ft).

== Behavior ==
=== Feeding ===
The Peruvian wren forages in groups that appear to be extended families. It usually feeds on or near the ground in vegetation and litter, but its diet has not been documented.

=== Breeding ===
The Peruvian wren appears to have a protracted breeding season, based on the dates that occupied nests, newly hatched chicks, and fledglings have been observed. One nest has been described; it was a pouch with a down-facing entrance tunnel, constructed of rootlets, moss, and bamboo leaves, and suspended from a bamboo stem.

=== Vocalization ===
Peruvian wren pairs often sing in duet, "a magnificent series of rich trills and clear whistles" . Its call is "a gravelly, chattering 'ch-d-d-d'" .

== Status ==
The IUCN has assessed the Peruvian wren as being of Least Concern. It is "[q]uite common in suitable habitat in parts of its range" but its "population is suspected to be in decline owing to ongoing habitat destruction and fragmentation."
