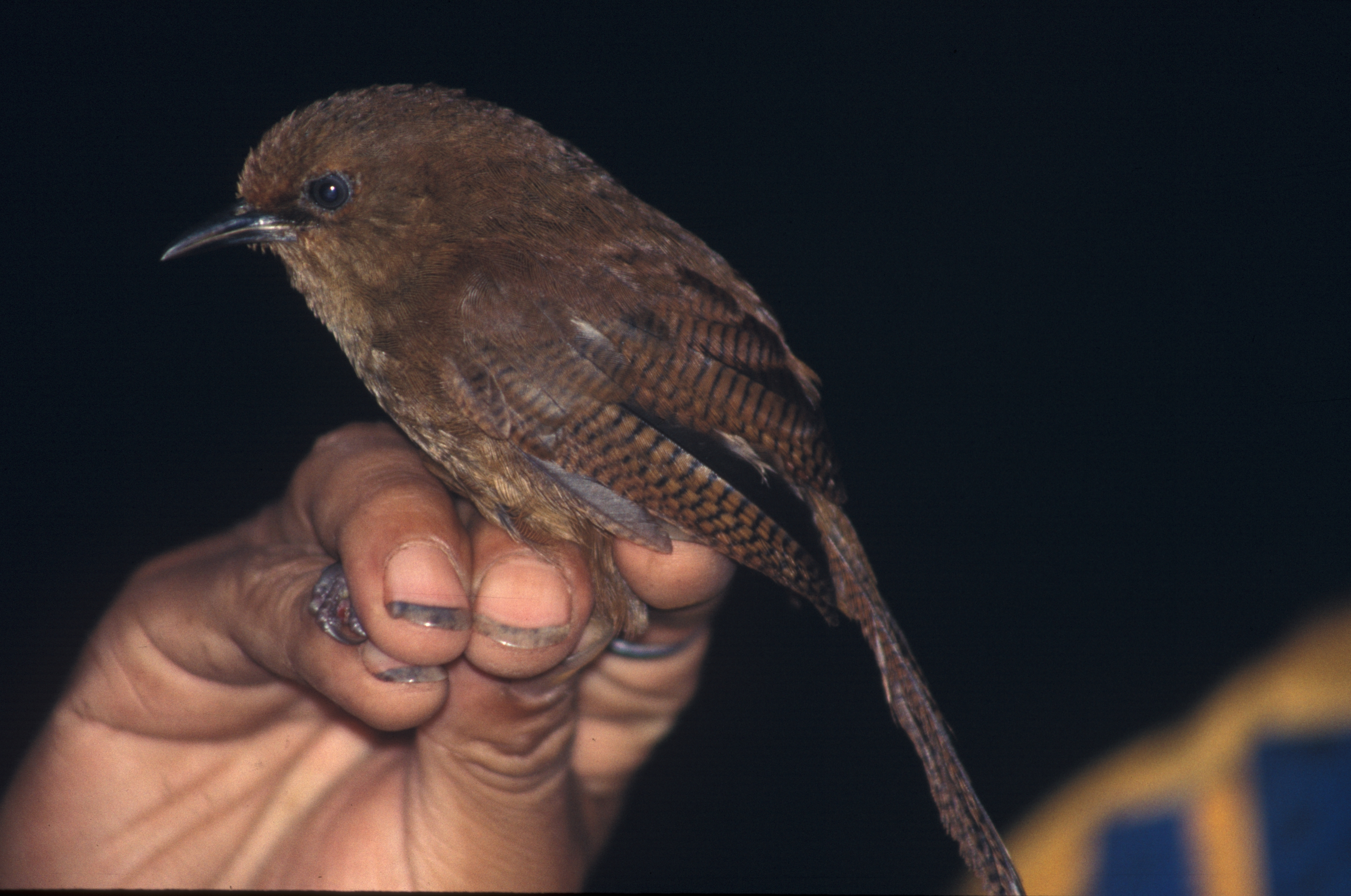
- Sepia-brown wren (Cinnycerthia olivascens)

Scientific classification
- Kingdom: Animalia
- Phylum: Chordata
- Class: Aves
- Order: Passeriformes
- Family: Troglodytidae
- Genus: Cinnycerthia; Lesson, 1844

Type species
- Cinnycerthia cinnamomea Lesson, 1844

= Cinnycerthia =

Genus of birds

Cinnycerthia is a genus of bird in the wren family, Troglodytidae. It contains four species which inhabit the undergrowth of montane forests in the Andes. None of them are considered to be threatened with extinction and they are classified as species of Least Concern by BirdLife International. They are 14–16.5 cm long and have a fairly short bill and fairly plain reddish-brown plumage with dark bars on the wings and tail. The name of the genus is a combination of Cinnyris, a genus of sunbirds, and Certhia, a genus of treecreepers.

== Species list ==
The genus contains the following species:

- Rufous wren (Cinnycerthia unirufa);
- Sepia-brown wren (Cinnycerthia olivascens);
- Peruvian wren (Cinnycerthia peruana);
- Fulvous wren (Cinnycerthia fulva).

The sepia-brown and fulvous wrens were formerly treated as subspecies of the Peruvian wren.
