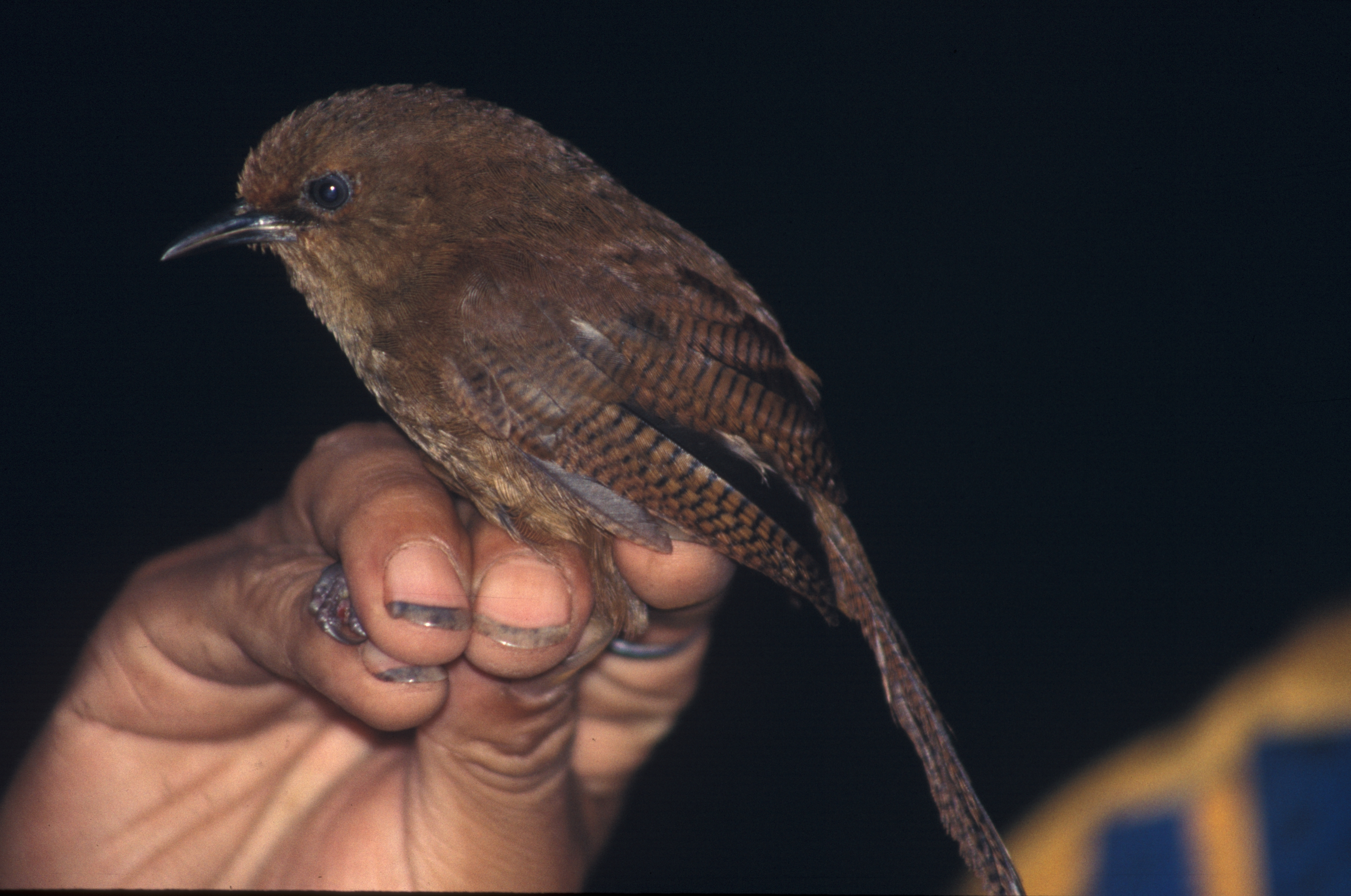

Conservation status
- Least Concern (IUCN 3.1)

Scientific classification
- Kingdom: Animalia
- Phylum: Chordata
- Class: Aves
- Order: Passeriformes
- Family: Troglodytidae
- Genus: Cinnycerthia
- Species: C. olivascens

Binomial name
- Cinnycerthia olivascens Sharpe, 1882

Synonyms
- Cinnicerthia olivascens

= Sepia-brown wren =

Species of bird

The sepia-brown wren or Sharpe's wren (Cinnycerthia olivascens) is a species of bird in the family Troglodytidae. It is found in Colombia, Ecuador, and Peru.

== Taxonomy and systematics ==
The sepia-brown wren was formerly considered a subspecies of Cinnycerthia peruana, which at that time was called the sepia-brown wren and is now called the Peruvian wren. Sepia-brown wren, Peruvian wren, and fulvous wren (C. fulva) form a superspecies.

Usually "daughter" species resulting from splits do not retain the "parent's" English name. That is why the South American Classification Committee of the American Ornithological Society (SACC/AOS) and the Clements taxonomy call C. olivascens Sharpe's wren. That common name commemorates the British zoologist Richard Bowdler Sharpe.

The sepia-brown wren has two subspecies, the nominate Cinnicerthia olivascens olivascens and C. o. bogotensis.

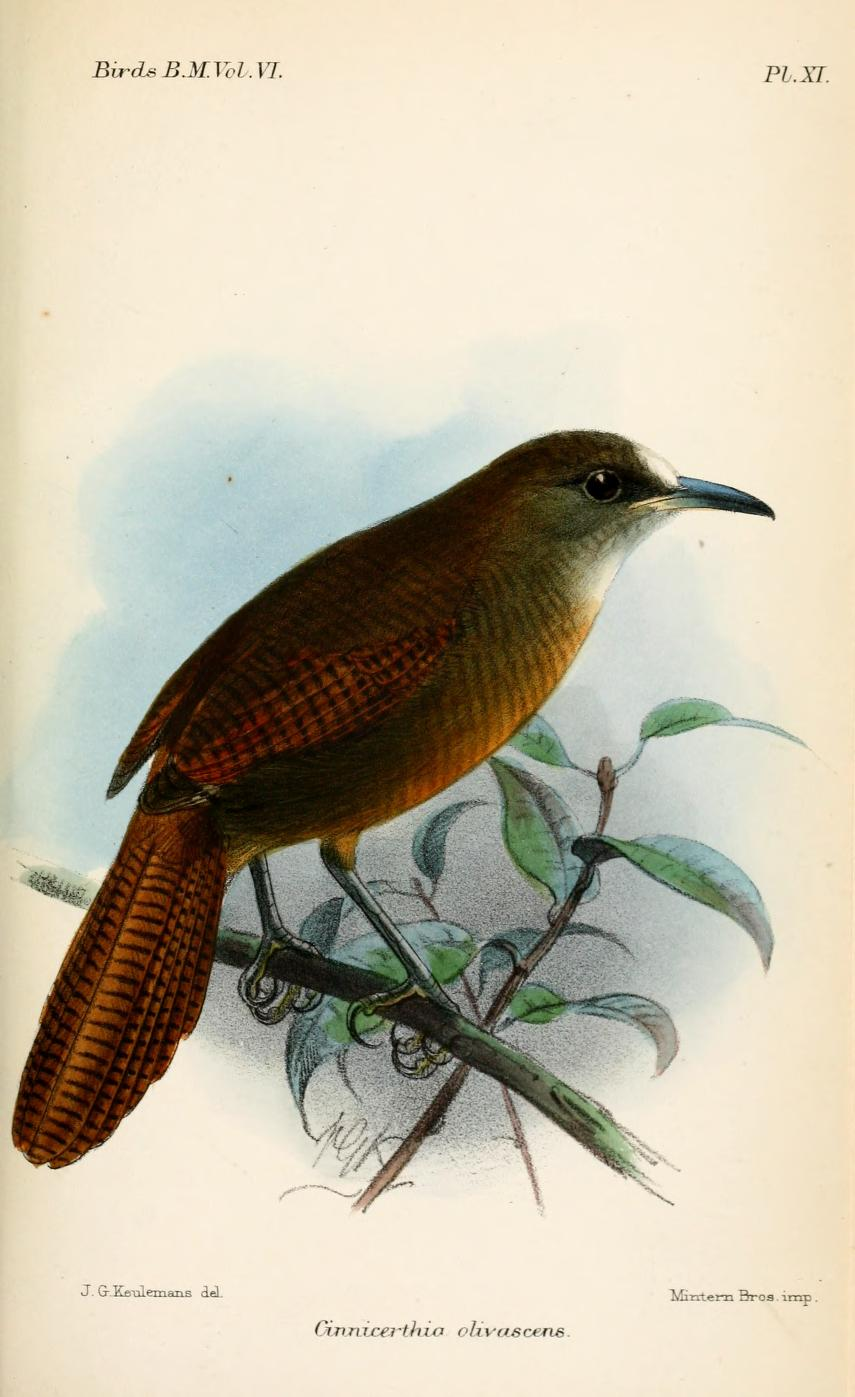
Illustration by Keulemans, 1881

== Description ==
The sepia-brown wren is 16 cm (6.3 in) long; males weigh an average of 25.9 g (0.91 oz) and females weigh an average of 23 g (0.81 oz). Both subspecies are shades of brown. The nominate adult has a grayish brown crown, reddish brown back and rump, and a chesnut tail with blackish bars. It has a variable amount of white on its face. Its chin and throat are pale grayish brown darkening to dark reddish brown on the belly and vent. C. o. bogotensis is much darker overall and has no white on the face. Immatures are like the adults but with a grayish face.

== Distribution and habitat ==
The nominate sepia-brown wren is found from the Central and Western Andes of Colombia south through Ecuador into extreme northern Peru. C. o. bogotensis is restricted to the western slope of Colombia's Eastern Andes. The species inhabits the interior and edges of wet mossy forest and cloudforest. In elevation it generally ranges between 1,500 and 3,100 m (4,900 and 10,200 ft) but is found as low as 900 m (3,000 ft) on the Pacific slope in Colombia.

== Behavior ==
=== Feeding ===
The sepia-brown wren forages on and near the ground in dense vegetation, often in flocks of up to 10 individuals. Its diet is invertebrates including insects and their larva, snails, and earthworms.

=== Breeding ===
The sepia-brown wren is a cooperative breeder consisting of a breeding pair and up to five others. They build and sleep together in a roost nest. The breeding pair lays its eggs in a separate nest, a bulky ball with a down-facing tubular entrance. They are made of rootlets, moss, and bamboo leaves, and are placed in a small shrub or tree.

=== Vocalization ===
The sepia-brown wren's song is "complex and variable, a series of musical phrases with changing stress" . Its call is "a soft, low 'wurt'" .

== Status ==
The IUCN has assessed the sepia-brown wren as being of Least Concern. It is "[f]airly common in suitable habitat in most of the range" and occurs in several protected areas. However, "The population is suspected to be in decline owing to ongoing habitat destruction and fragmentation."
