= List of birds of Belize =

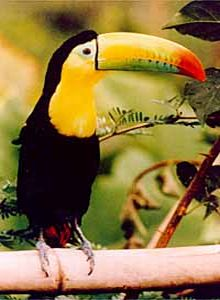
The keel-billed toucan is the national bird of Belize.

This is a list of the bird species recorded in Belize. Belize includes around 450 smaller cays and islands lying in the Caribbean Sea in addition to the mainland. The avifauna of Belize included a total of 621 species as of May 2023, according to Bird Checklists of the World. Of the 618, 99 are rare or accidental and four have been introduced. None are endemic to the country. Additional accidental species have been added from another source.

This list is presented in the taxonomic sequence of the Check-list of North and Middle American Birds, 7th edition through the 63rd Supplement, published by the American Ornithological Society (AOS). Common and scientific names are also those of the Check-list, except that the common names of families are from the Clements taxonomy because the AOS list does not include them.

Unless otherwise noted, the species on this list are considered to occur regularly in Belize as permanent residents, summer or winter visitors, or migrants. The following tags have been used to highlight several categories. The tags and notes of population status are from Bird Checklists of the World.

- (A) Accidental - a species that rarely or accidentally occurs in Belize
- (I) Introduced - a species introduced to Belize as a consequence, direct or indirect, of human actions

== Tinamous ==
Order: Tinamiformes Family: Tinamidae

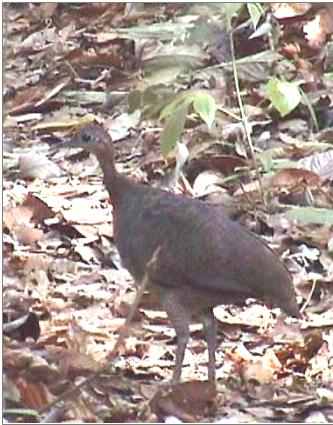
Great tinamou

The tinamous are one of the most ancient groups of bird. Although they look similar to other ground-dwelling birds like quail and grouse, they are not related to these birds, being palaeognaths, and are classified as a single family, Tinamidae, within their own order, the Tinamiformes. They are related to the ratites, that include the rheas, emus, and kiwis.

- Great tinamou, Tinamus major (near-threatened)
- Little tinamou, Crypturellus soui
- Slaty-breasted tinamou, Crypturellus boucardi
- Thicket tinamou, Crypturellus cinnamomeus

== Ducks, geese, and waterfowl ==
Order: Anseriformes Family: Anatidae

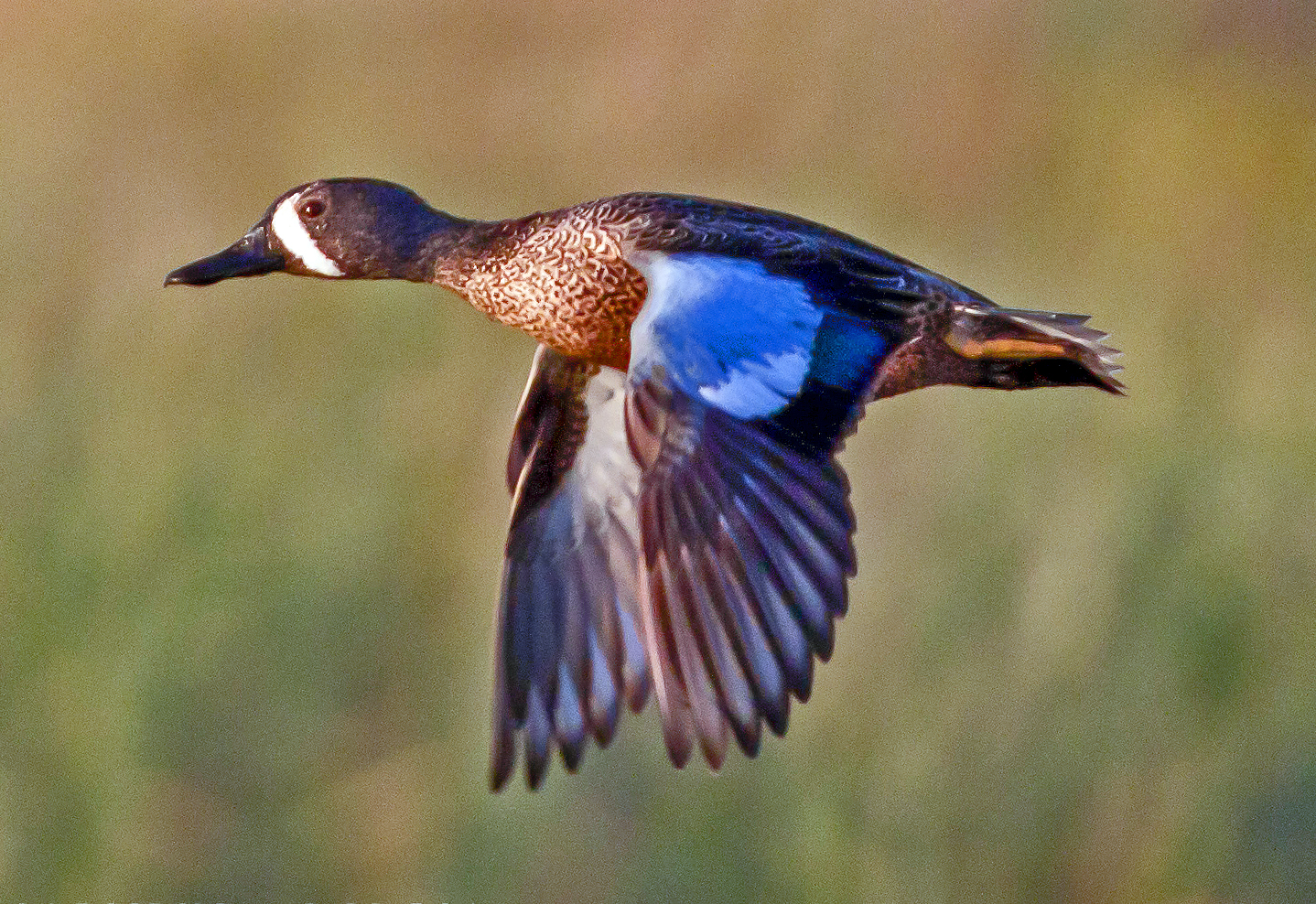
Blue-winged teal

Anatidae includes the ducks and most duck-like waterfowl such as geese and swans. These birds are adapted to an aquatic existence with webbed feet, flattened bills, and feathers that are excellent at shedding water due to an oily coating.

- Black-bellied whistling-duck, Dendrocygna autumnalis
- Fulvous whistling-duck, Dendrocygna bicolor (A)
- Snow goose, Anser caerulescens (A)
- Greater white-fronted goose, Anser albifrons (A)
- Canada goose, Branta canadensis (A)
- Muscovy duck, Cairina moschata
- Blue-winged teal, Spatula discors
- Cinnamon teal, Spatula cyanoptera
- Northern shoveler, Spatula clypeata
- Gadwall, Mareca strepera (A)
- American wigeon, Mareca americana
- Mallard, Anas platyrhynchos (A)
- Northern pintail, Anas acuta
- Green-winged teal, Anas crecca
- Redhead, Aythya americana (A)
- Ring-necked duck, Aythya collaris (A)
- Greater scaup, Aythya marila (A)
- Lesser scaup, Aythya affinis
- Hooded merganser, Lophodytes cucullatus (A)
- Red-breasted merganser, Mergus serrator (A)
- Masked duck, Nomonyx dominicus (A)
- Ruddy duck, Oxyura jamaicensis (A)

== Guans, chachalacas, and curassows ==
Order: Galliformes Family: Cracidae

The Cracidae are large birds, similar in general appearance to turkeys. The guans and curassows live in trees, but the smaller chachalacas are found in more open scrubby habitats. They are generally dull-plumaged, but the curassows and some guans have colorful facial ornaments.

- Plain chachalaca, Ortalis vetula
- Crested guan, Penelope purpurascens
- Great curassow, Crax rubra (vulnerable)

== New World quail ==
Order: Galliformes Family: Odontophoridae

The New World quails are small, plump terrestrial birds only distantly related to the quails of the Old World, but named for their similar appearance and habits.

- Black-throated bobwhite, Colinus nigrogularis
- Singing quail, Dactylortyx thoracicus (A)
- Spotted wood-quail, Odontophorus guttatus

== Pheasants, grouse, and allies ==
Order: Galliformes Family: Phasianidae

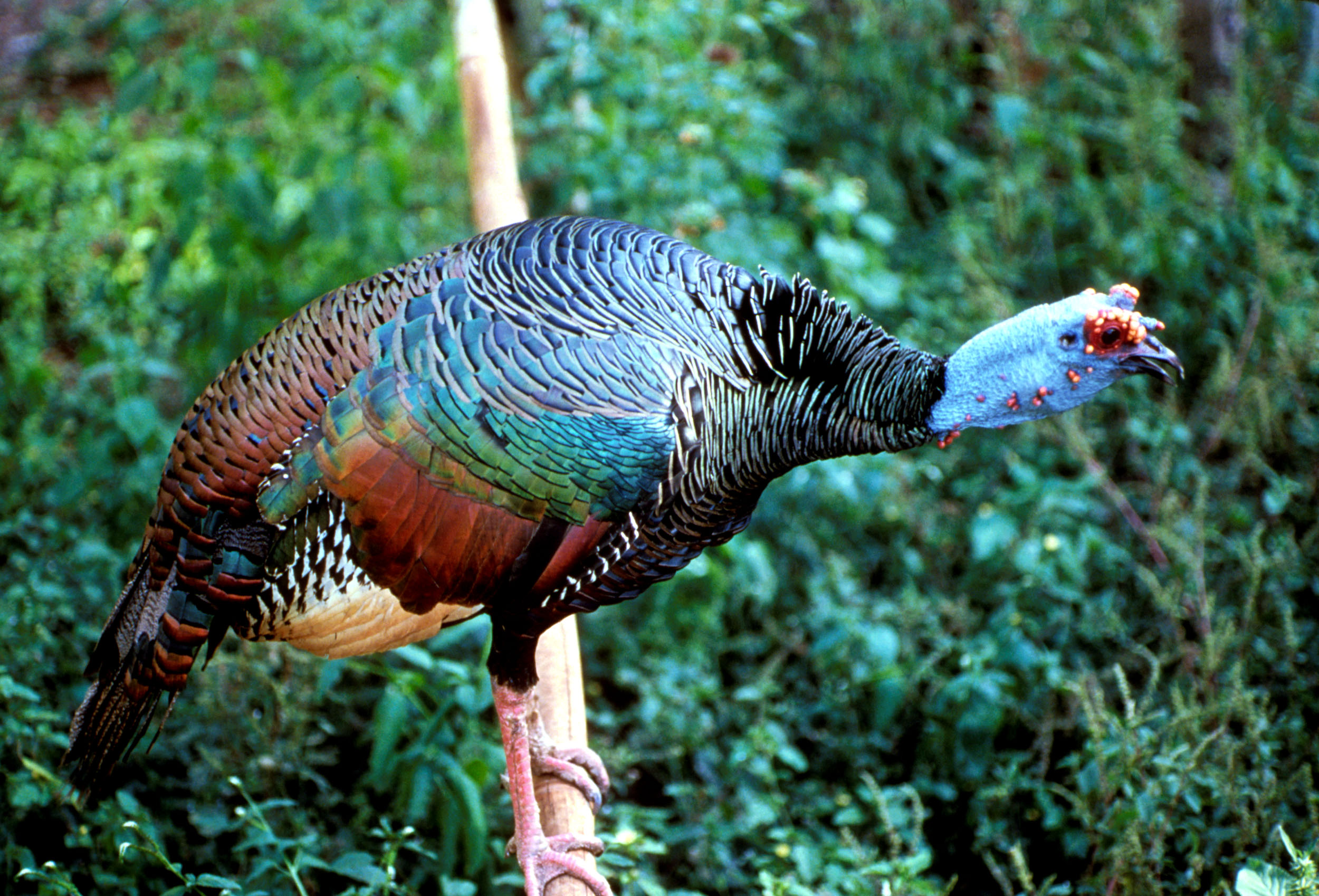
Ocellated turkey

Turkeys are similar to large pheasants but have a distinctive fleshy wattle that hangs from the beak, called a snood.

- Ocellated turkey, Meleagris ocellata (near-threatened)

== Flamingos ==
Order: Phoenicopteriformes Family: Phoenicopteridae

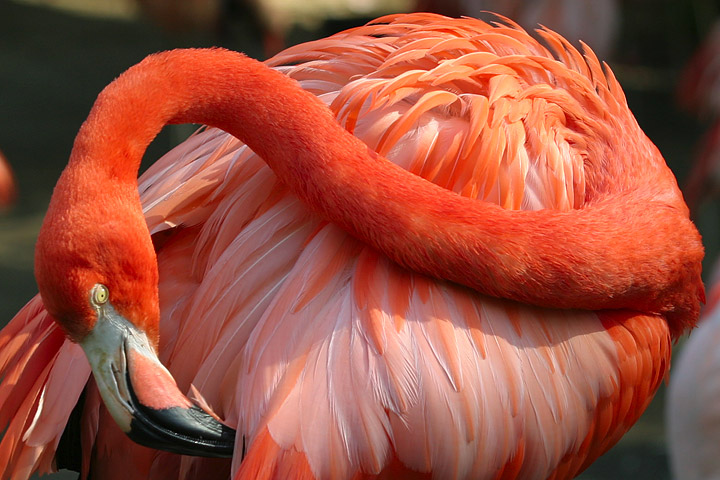
American flamingo

Flamingos are gregarious wading birds, usually 3 to 5 feet (0.9 to 1.5 m) tall, found in both the Western and Eastern Hemispheres. Flamingos filter-feed on shellfish and algae. Their oddly shaped beaks are specially adapted to separate mud and silt from the food they consume and, uniquely, are used upside-down.

- American flamingo, Phoenicopterus ruber (A)

== Grebes ==
Order: Podicipediformes Family: Podicipedidae

Grebes are small to medium-large freshwater diving birds. They have lobed toes and are excellent swimmers and divers. However, they have their feet placed far back on the body, making them quite ungainly on land.

- Least grebe, Tachybaptus dominicus
- Pied-billed grebe, Podilymbus podiceps

== Pigeons and doves ==
Order: Columbiformes Family: Columbidae

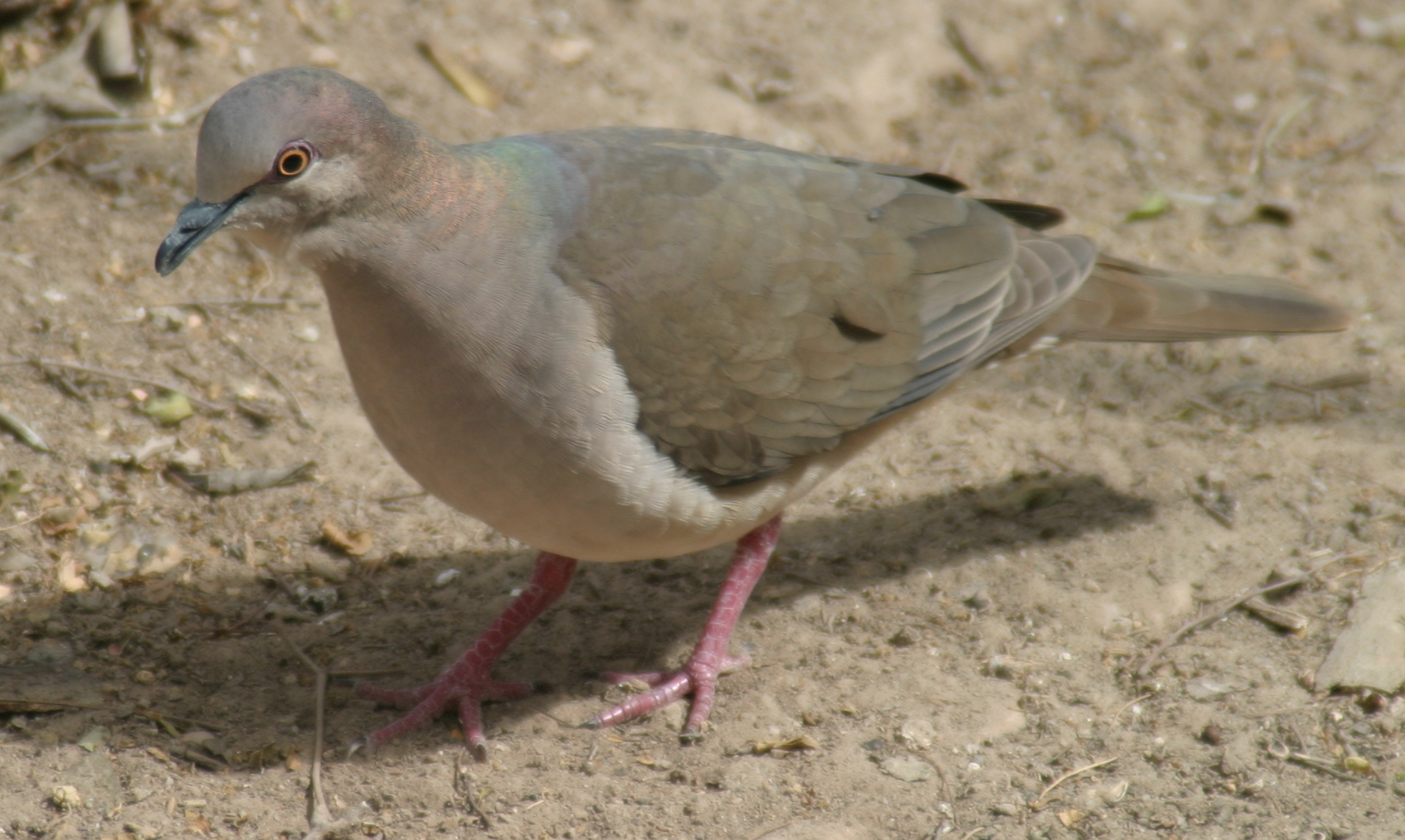
White-tipped dove

Pigeons and doves are stout-bodied birds with short necks and short slender bills with a fleshy cere.

- Rock pigeon, Columba livia (I)
- Pale-vented pigeon, Patagioenas cayennensis
- Scaled pigeon, Patagioenas speciosa
- White-crowned pigeon, Patagioenas leucocephala (near-threatened)
- Red-billed pigeon, Patagioenas flavirostris
- Short-billed pigeon, Patagioenas nigrirostris
- Eurasian collared-dove, Streptopelia decaocto (I)
- Inca dove, Columbina inca (A)
- Common ground dove, Columbina passerina
- Plain-breasted ground dove, Columbina minuta
- Ruddy ground dove, Columbina talpacoti
- Blue ground dove, Claravis pretiosa
- Ruddy quail-dove, Geotrygon montana
- White-tipped dove, Leptotila verreauxi
- Caribbean dove, Leptotila jamaicensis
- Gray-chested dove, Leptotila cassinii
- Gray-headed dove, Leptotila plumbeiceps
- White-winged dove, Zenaida asiatica
- Mourning dove, Zenaida macroura

== Cuckoos ==
Order: Cuculiformes Family: Cuculidae

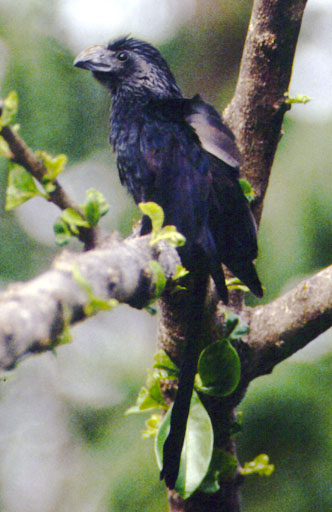
Groove-billed ani

The family Cuculidae includes cuckoos, roadrunners, and anis. These birds are of variable size with slender bodies, long tails, and strong legs. The Old World cuckoos are brood parasites.

- Smooth-billed ani, Crotophaga ani
- Groove-billed ani, Crotophaga sulcirostris
- Striped cuckoo, Tapera naevia
- Pheasant cuckoo, Dromococcyx phasianellus
- Squirrel cuckoo, Piaya cayana
- Dark-billed cuckoo, Coccyzus melacoryphus (A)
- Yellow-billed cuckoo, Coccyzus americanus
- Mangrove cuckoo, Coccyzus minor
- Black-billed cuckoo, Coccyzus erythropthalmus

== Nightjars and allies ==
Order: Caprimulgiformes Family: Caprimulgidae

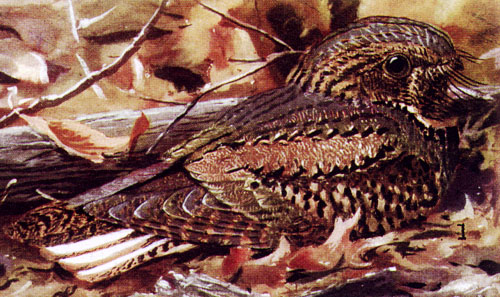
Chuck-will's-widow

Nightjars are medium-sized nocturnal birds that usually nest on the ground. They have long wings, short legs, and very short bills. Most have small feet, of little use for walking, and long pointed wings. Their soft plumage is camouflaged to resemble bark or leaves.

- Short-tailed nighthawk, Lurocalis semitorquatus (A)
- Lesser nighthawk, Chordeiles acutipennis
- Common nighthawk, Chordeiles minor
- Common pauraque, Nyctidromus albicollis
- Yucatan poorwill, Nyctiphrynus yucatanicus
- Chuck-will's-widow, Antrostomus carolinensis (near-threatened)
- Yucatan nightjar, Antrostomus badius
- Eastern whip-poor-will, Antrostomus vociferus (near-threatened)

== Potoos ==
Order: Nyctibiiformes Family: Nyctibiidae

The potoos (sometimes called poor-me-ones) are large near passerine birds related to the nightjars and frogmouths. They are nocturnal insectivores which lack the bristles around the mouth found in the true nightjars.

- Great potoo, Nyctibius grandis
- Northern potoo, Nyctibius jamaicensis

== Swifts ==
Order: Apodiformes Family: Apodidae

Swifts are small birds which spend the majority of their lives flying. These birds have very short legs and never settle voluntarily on the ground, perching instead only on vertical surfaces. Many swifts have long swept-back wings which resemble a crescent or boomerang.

- Black swift, Cypseloides niger (A) (vulnerable)
- White-chinned swift, Cypseloides cryptus (A)
- Chestnut-collared swift, Streptoprocne rutila
- White-collared swift, Streptoprocne zonaris
- Chimney swift, Chaetura pelagica (vulnerable)
- Vaux's swift, Chaetura vauxi
- Lesser swallow-tailed swift, Panyptila cayennensis

== Hummingbirds ==
Order: Apodiformes Family: Trochilidae

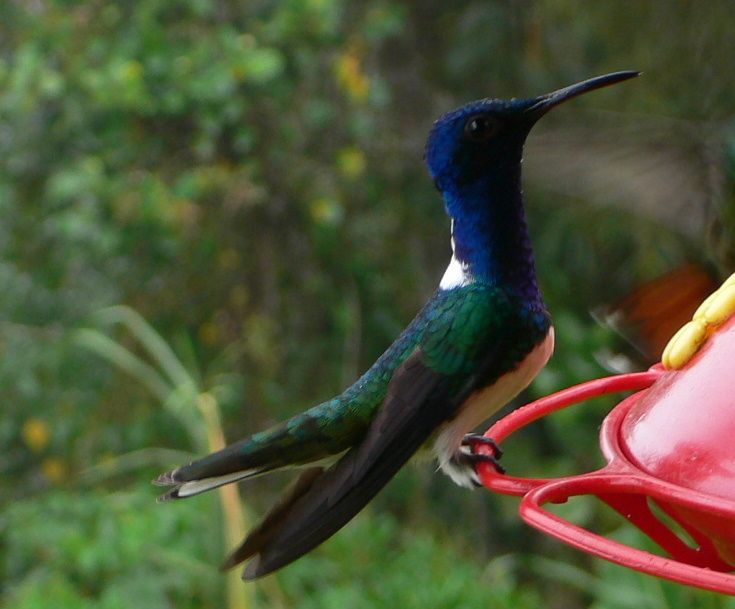
White-necked jacobin

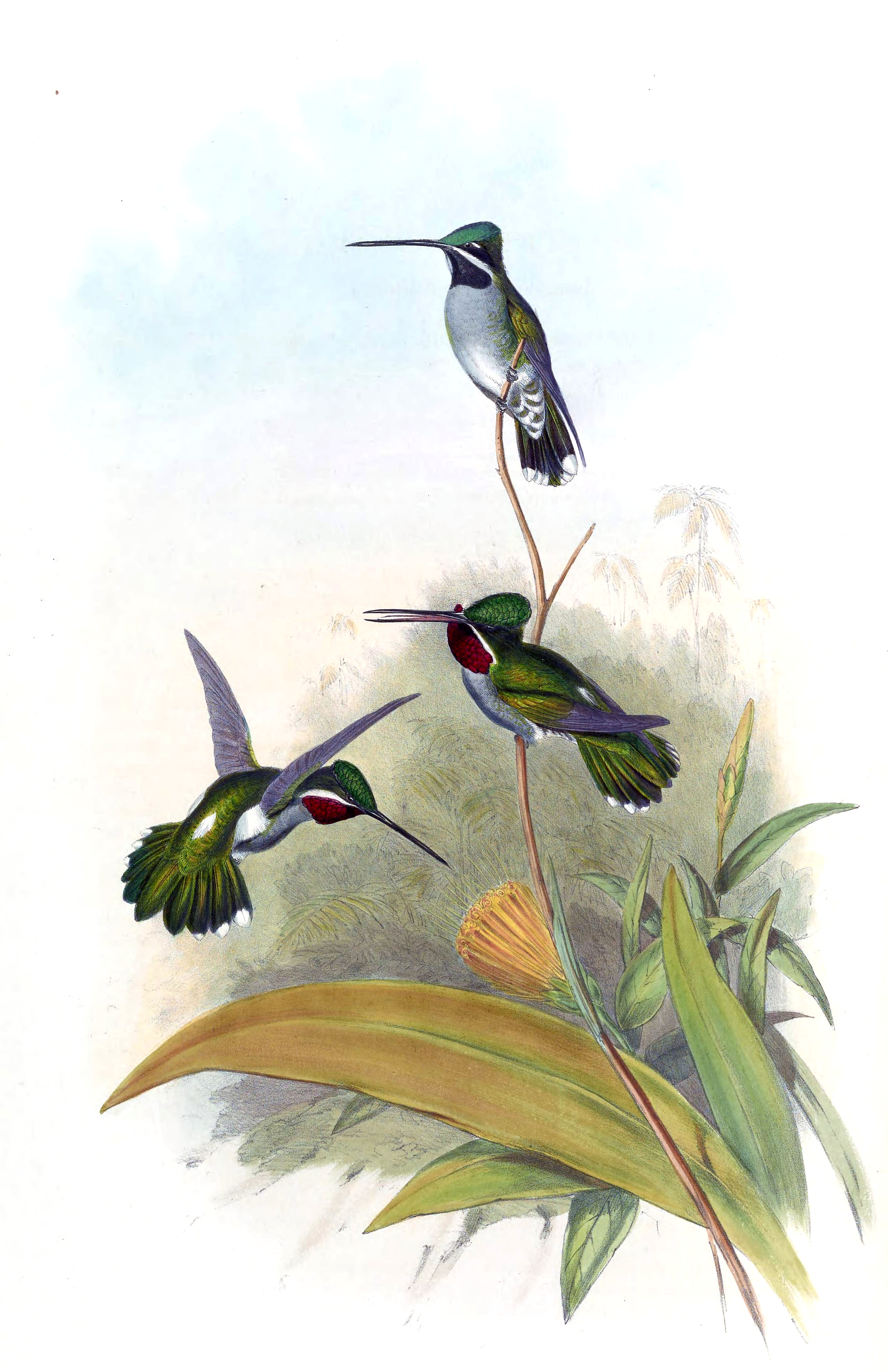
Long-billed starthroat

Hummingbirds are small birds capable of hovering in mid-air due to the rapid flapping of their wings. They are the only birds that can fly backwards.

- White-necked jacobin, Florisuga mellivora
- Band-tailed barbthroat, Threnetes ruckeri
- Long-billed hermit, Phaethornis longirostris
- Stripe-throated hermit, Phaethornis striigularis
- Brown violetear, Colibri delphinae
- Purple-crowned fairy, Heliothryx barroti
- Green-breasted mango, Anthracothorax prevostii
- Black-crested coquette, Lophornis helenae
- Long-billed starthroat, Heliomaster longirostris
- Plain-capped starthroat, Heliomaster constantii (A)
- Ruby-throated hummingbird, Archilochus colubris
- Canivet's Emerald, Cynanthus canivetii
- Wedge-tailed sabrewing, Pampa curvipennis
- Violet-headed hummingbird, Klais guimeti (A)
- Violet sabrewing, Campylopterus hemileucurus
- Crowned woodnymph, Thalurania colombica
- Stripe-tailed hummingbird, Eupherusa eximia
- Scaly-breasted hummingbird, Phaeochroa cuvierii
- Azure-crowned hummingbird, Saucerottia cyanocephala
- Cinnamon hummingbird, Amazilia rutila
- Buff-bellied hummingbird, Amazilia yucatanensis
- Rufous-tailed hummingbird, Amazilia tzacatl
- White-bellied emerald, Chlorestes candida
- Blue-throated goldentail, Chlorestes eliciae (A)

== Rails, gallinules and coots ==
Order: Gruiformes Family: Rallidae

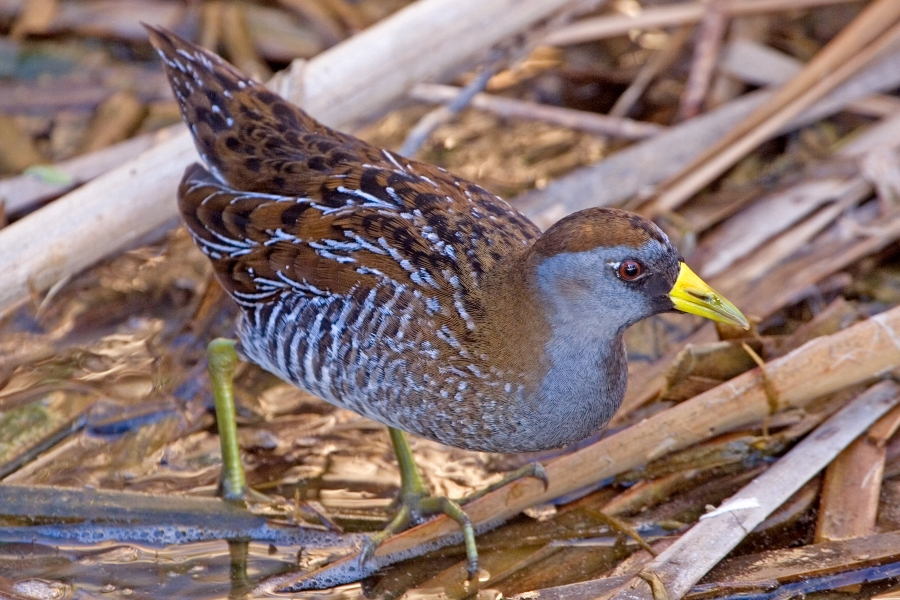
Sora

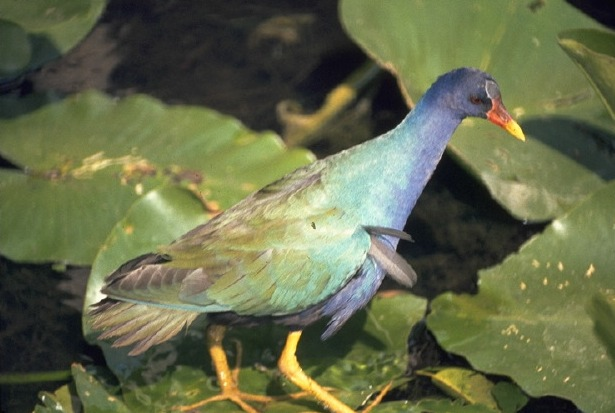
Purple gallinule

Rallidae is a large family of small to medium-sized birds which includes the rails, crakes, coots, and gallinules. Typically they inhabit dense vegetation in damp environments near lakes, swamps, or rivers. In general they are shy and secretive birds, making them difficult to observe. Most species have strong legs and long toes which are well adapted to soft uneven surfaces. They tend to have short, rounded wings and to be weak fliers.

- Spotted rail, Pardirallus maculatus
- Uniform crake, Amaurolimnas concolor
- Rufous-necked wood-rail, Aramides axillaris
- Russet-naped wood-rail, Aramides albiventris
- Clapper rail, Rallus crepitans
- Sora, Porzana carolina
- Common gallinule, Gallinula galeata
- American coot, Fulica americana
- Purple gallinule, Porphyrio martinicus
- Yellow-breasted crake, Hapalocrex flaviventer
- Ruddy crake, Laterallus ruber
- Gray-breasted crake, Laterallus exilis
- Black rail, Laterallus jamaicensis (A)

== Finfoots ==
Order: Gruiformes Family: Heliornithidae

Heliornithidae is a small family of tropical birds with webbed lobes on their feet similar to those of grebes and coots.

- Sungrebe, Heliornis fulica

== Limpkin ==
Order: Gruiformes Family: Aramidae

The limpkin resembles a large rail. It has drab-brown plumage and a grayer head and neck.

- Limpkin, Aramus guarauna

== Stilts and avocets ==
Order: Charadriiformes Family: Recurvirostridae

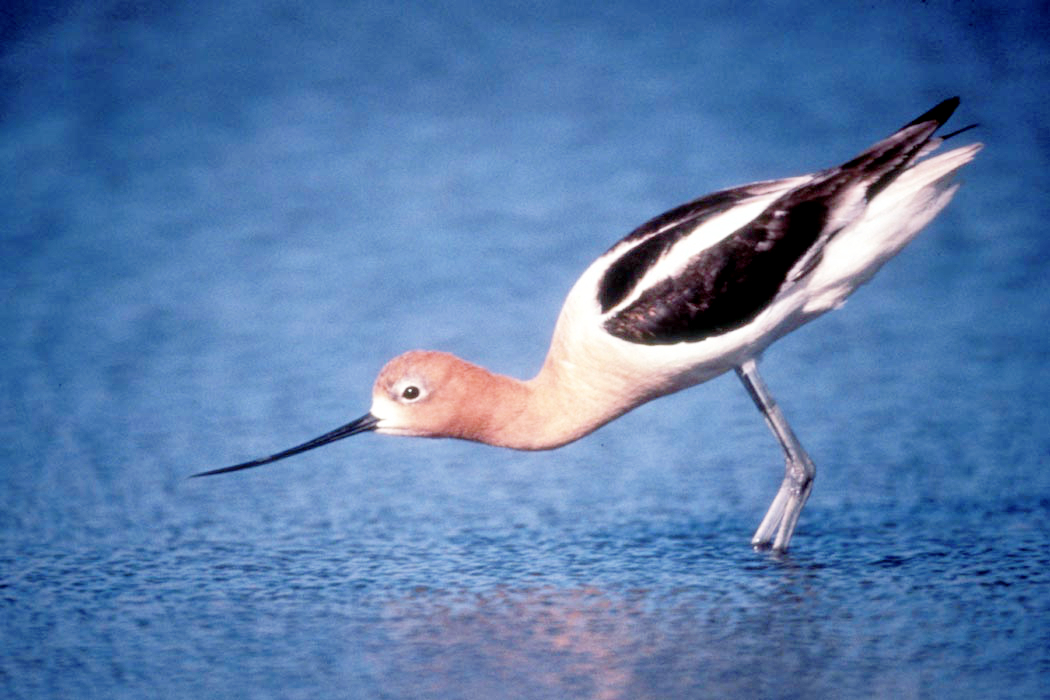
American avocet

Recurvirostridae is a family of large wading birds which includes the avocets and stilts. The avocets have long legs and long up-curved bills. The stilts have extremely long legs and long, thin, straight bills.

- Black-necked stilt, Himantopus mexicanus
- American avocet, Recurvirostra americana (A)

== Oystercatchers ==
Order: Charadriiformes Family: Haematopodidae

The oystercatchers are large and noisy plover-like birds, with strong bills used for smashing or prising open molluscs.

- American oystercatcher, Haematopus palliatus

== Plovers and lapwings ==
Order: Charadriiformes Family: Charadriidae

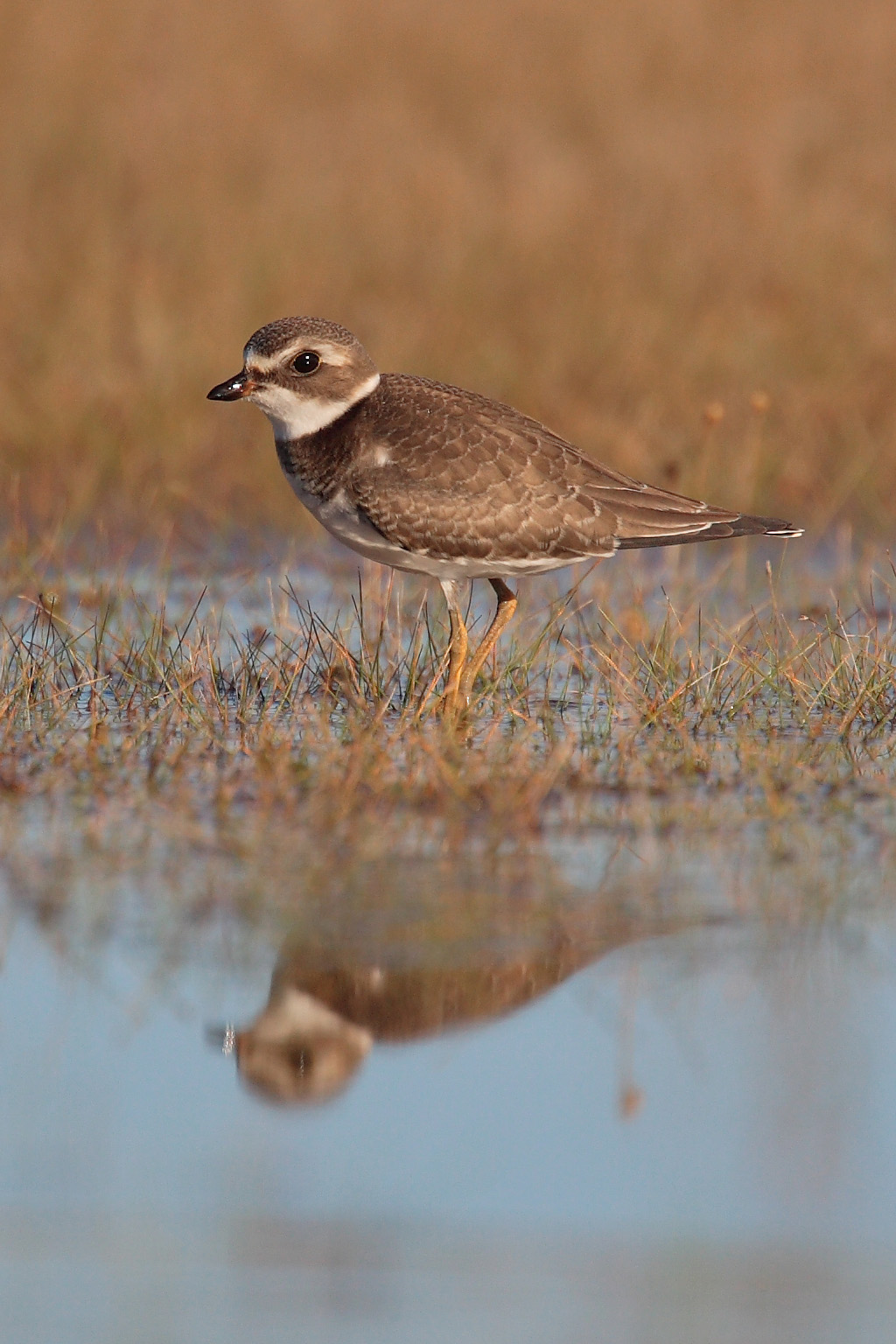
Semipalmated plover

The family Charadriidae includes the plovers, dotterels, and lapwings. They are small to medium-sized birds with compact bodies, short thick necks, and long, usually pointed, wings. They are found in open country worldwide, mostly in habitats near water.

- Southern lapwing, Vanellus chilensis (A)
- Black-bellied plover, Pluvialis squatarola
- American golden-plover, Pluvialis dominica
- Pacific golden-plover, Pluvialis fulva (A)
- Killdeer, Charadrius vociferus
- Semipalmated plover, Charadrius semipalmatus
- Wilson's plover, Charadrius wilsonia
- Collared plover, Charadrius collaris (A)
- Snowy plover, Charadrius nivosus (near-threatened)

== Jacanas ==
Order: Charadriiformes Family: Jacanidae

The jacanas are a family of waders which are found throughout the tropics. They are identifiable by their huge feet and claws which enable them to walk on floating vegetation in the shallow lakes that are their preferred habitat.

- Northern jacana, Jacana spinosa

== Sandpipers and allies ==
Order: Charadriiformes Family: Scolopacidae

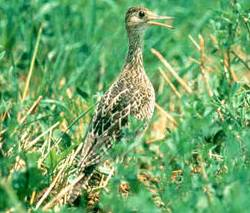
Upland sandpiper

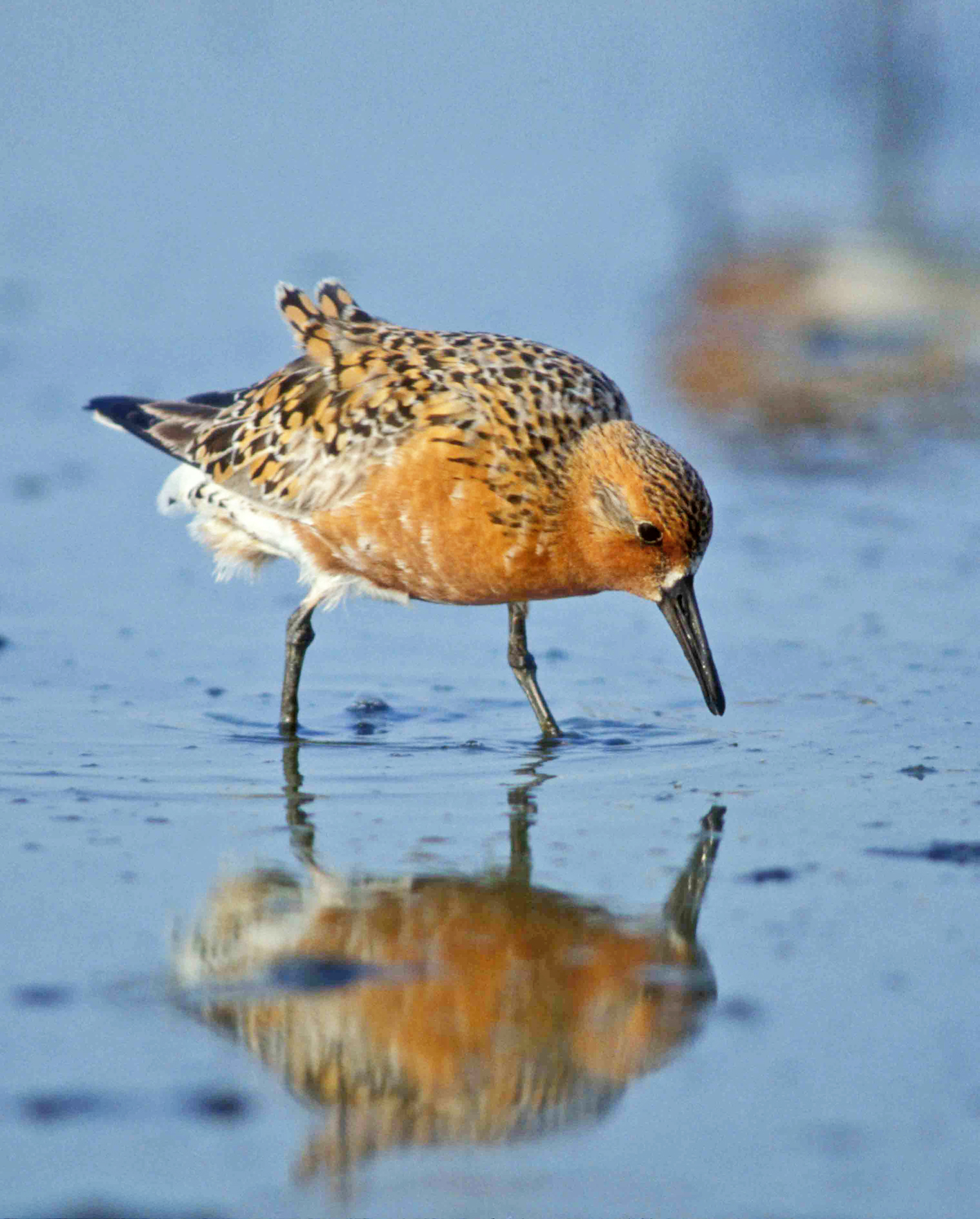
Red knot

Scolopacidae is a large diverse family of small to medium-sized shorebirds including the sandpipers, curlews, godwits, shanks, tattlers, woodcocks, snipes, dowitchers, and phalaropes. The majority of these species eat small invertebrates picked out of the mud or soil. Variation in length of legs and bills enables multiple species to feed in the same habitat, particularly on the coast, without direct competition for food.

- Upland sandpiper, Bartramia longicauda
- Whimbrel, Numenius phaeopus
- Long-billed curlew, Numenius americanus (near-threatened)
- Hudsonian godwit, Limosa haemastica (A)
- Marbled godwit, Limosa fedoa (A)
- Ruddy turnstone, Arenaria interpres
- Red knot, Calidris canutus (near-threatened)
- Ruff, Calidris pugnax (A)
- Stilt sandpiper, Calidris himantopus
- Sanderling, Calidris alba
- Dunlin, Calidris alpina
- Baird's sandpiper, Calidris bairdii (A)
- Least sandpiper, Calidris minutilla
- White-rumped sandpiper, Calidris fuscicollis
- Buff-breasted sandpiper, Calidris subruficollis (near-threatened)
- Pectoral sandpiper, Calidris melanotos
- Semipalmated sandpiper, Calidris pusilla (near-threatened)
- Western sandpiper, Calidris mauri
- Short-billed dowitcher, Limnodromus griseus
- Long-billed dowitcher, Limnodromus scolopaceus
- Wilson's snipe, Gallinago delicata
- Spotted sandpiper, Actitis macularia
- Solitary sandpiper, Tringa solitaria
- Lesser yellowlegs, Tringa flavipes
- Willet, Tringa semipalmata
- Greater yellowlegs, Tringa melanoleuca
- Wilson's phalarope, Phalaropus tricolor
- Red-necked phalarope, Phalaropus lobatus (A)

== Skuas and jaegers ==
Order: Charadriiformes Family: Stercorariidae

The family Stercorariidae are, in general, medium to large birds, typically with gray or brown plumage, often with white markings on the wings. They nest on the ground in temperate and arctic regions and are long-distance migrants.

- Great skua, Stercorarius skua (A)
- Pomarine jaeger, Stercorarius pomarinus
- Parasitic jaeger, Stercorarius parasiticus (A)

== Gulls, terns, and skimmers ==
Order: Charadriiformes Family: Laridae

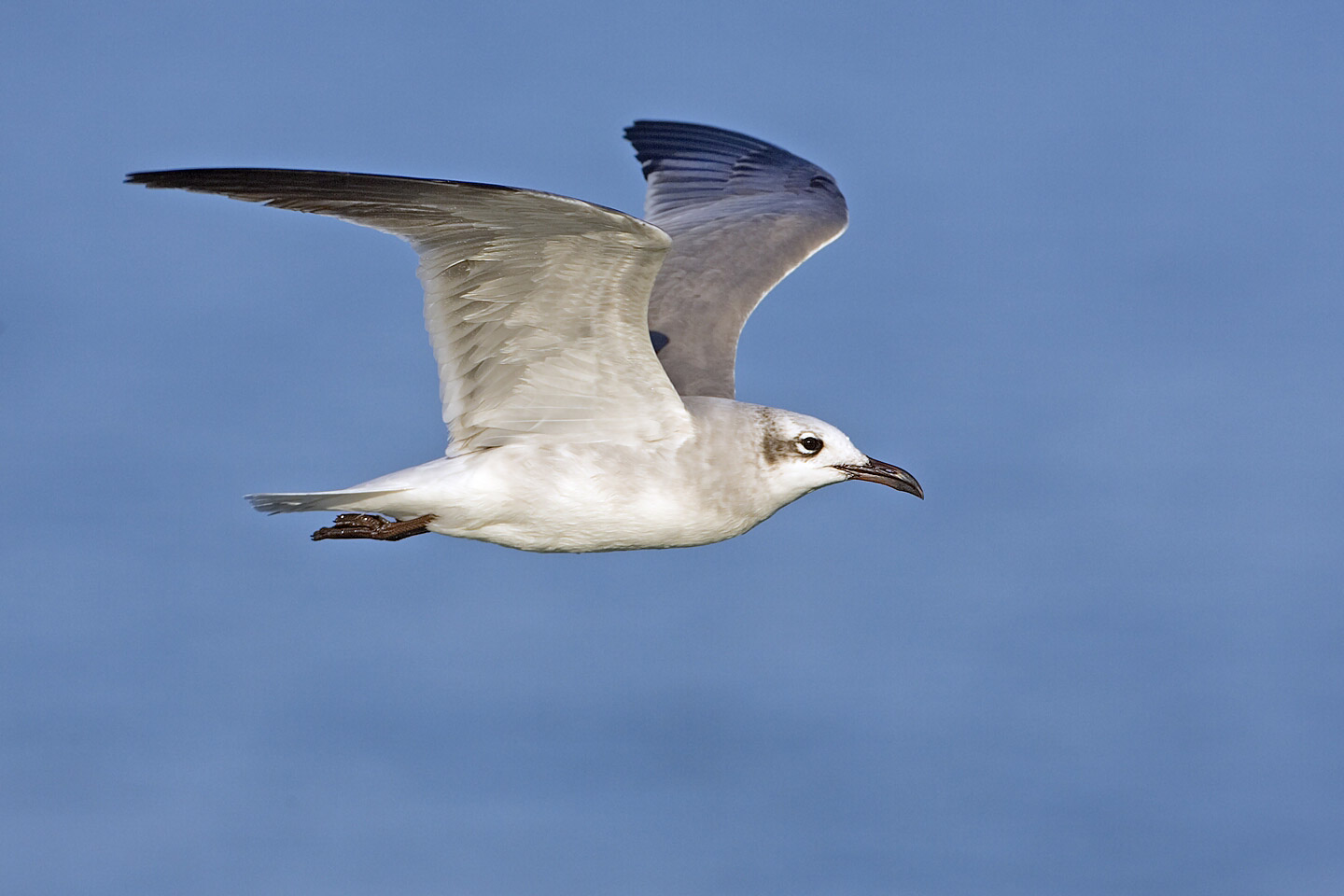
Laughing gull

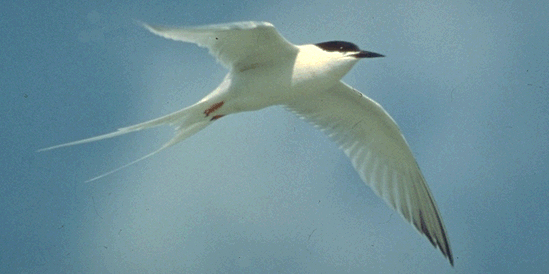
Roseate tern

Laridae is a family of medium to large seabirds and includes gulls, kittiwakes, terns, and skimmers. Gulls are typically gray or white, often with black markings on the head or wings. They have longish bills and webbed feet. Terns are a group of generally medium to large seabirds typically with grey or white plumage, often with black markings on the head. Most terns hunt fish by diving but some pick insects off the surface of fresh water. Terns are generally long-lived birds, with several species known to live in excess of 30 years. Skimmers are a small family of tropical tern-like birds. They have an elongated lower mandible which they use to feed by flying low over the water surface and skimming the water for small fish.

- Black-legged kittiwake, Rissa tridactyla (A)
- Bonaparte's gull, Chroicocephalus philadelphia (A)
- Laughing gull, Leucophaeus atricilla
- Franklin's gull, Leucophaeus pipixcan (A)
- Black-tailed gull, Larus crassirostris (A)
- Ring-billed gull, Larus delawarensis
- Herring gull, Larus argentatus
- Iceland Gull, Larus glaucoides (A)
- Lesser black-backed gull, Larus fuscus (A)
- Brown noddy, Anous stolidus
- Black noddy, Anous minutus (A)
- Sooty tern, Onychoprion fuscata
- Bridled tern, Onychoprion anaethetus
- Least tern, Sternula antillarum
- Gull-billed tern, Gelochelidon nilotica
- Caspian tern, Hydroprogne caspia
- Black tern, Chlidonias niger
- Roseate tern, Sterna dougallii
- Common tern, Sterna hirundo
- Arctic tern, Sterna paradisaea (A)
- Forster's tern, Sterna forsteri
- Royal tern, Thalasseus maxima
- Sandwich tern, Thalasseus sandvicensis
- Black skimmer, Rynchops niger

== Tropicbirds ==
Order: Phaethontiformes Family: Phaethontidae

Tropicbirds are slender white birds of tropical oceans with exceptionally long central tail feathers. Their heads and long wings have black markings.

- White-tailed tropicbird, Phaethon lepturus (A)

== Albatrosses ==
Order: Procellariiformes Family: Diomedeidae

The albatrosses are amongst the largest of flying birds, and the great albatrosses from the genus Diomedea have the largest wingspans of any extant birds.

- Yellow-nosed albatross, Thalassarche chlororhynchos (A)

== Southern storm-petrels ==
Order: Procellariiformes Family: Oceanitidae

The storm-petrels are the smallest seabirds, relatives of the petrels, feeding on planktonic crustaceans and small fish picked from the surface, typically while hovering. The flight is fluttering and sometimes bat-like. Until 2018, this family's three species were included with the other storm-petrels in family Hydrobatidae.

- Wilson's storm-petrel, Oceanites oceanicus (A)

== Northern storm-petrels ==
Order: Procellariiformes Family: Hydrobatidae

Though the members of the family are similar in many respects to the southern storm-petrels, including their general appearance and habits, there are enough genetic differences to warrant their placement in a separate family.

- Band-rumped storm-petrel, Hydrobates castro (A)

== Shearwaters and petrels ==
Order: Procellariiformes Family: Procellariidae

The procellariids are the main group of medium-sized "true petrels", characterized by united nostrils with medium septum and a long outer functional primary.

- Cory's shearwater, Calonectris diomedea (A)
- Great shearwater, Ardenna gravis (A)
- Manx shearwater, Puffinus puffinus (A)
- Sargasso shearwater, Puffinus lherminieri (A)

== Storks ==
Order: Ciconiiformes Family: Ciconiidae

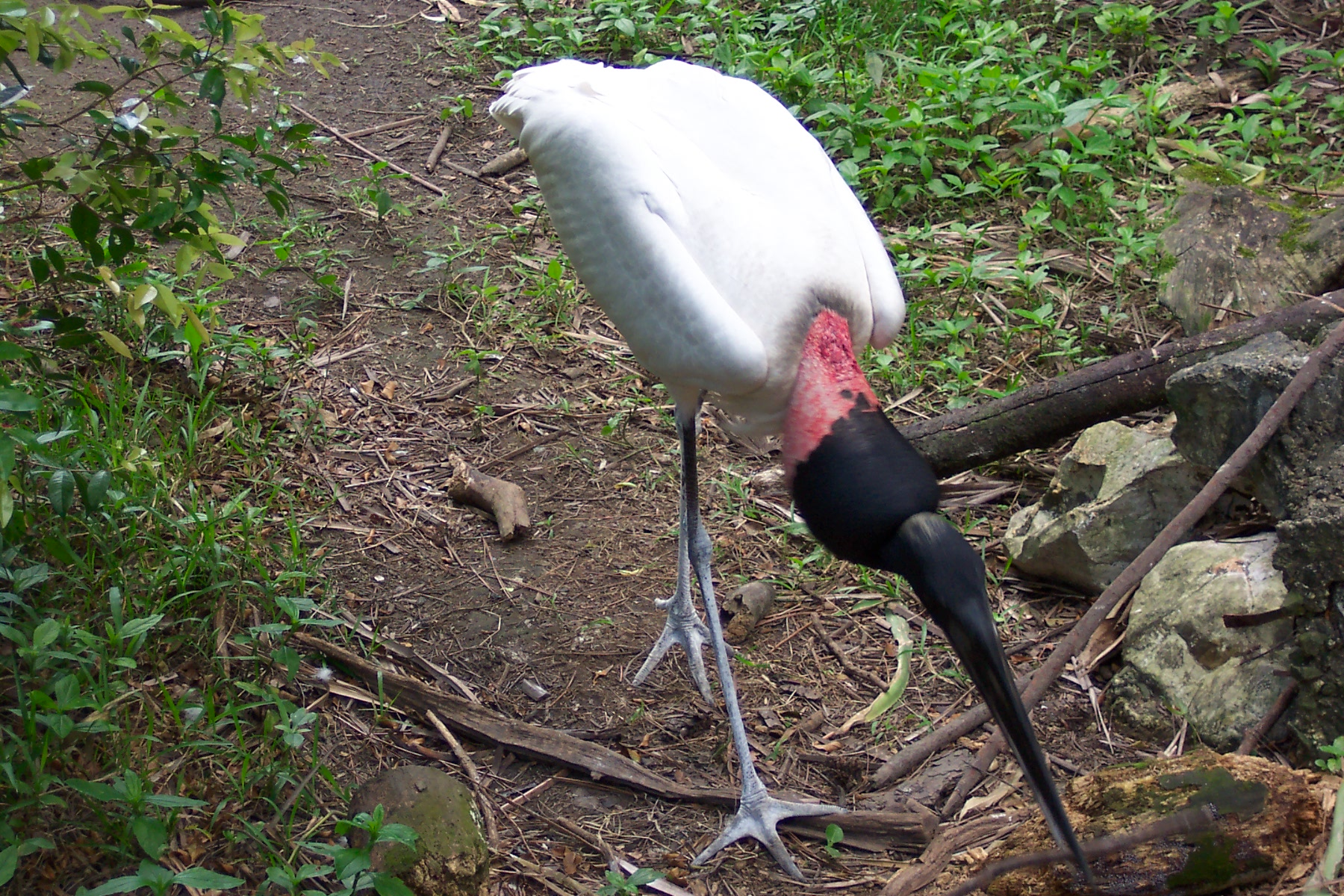
Jabiru

Storks are large, long-legged, long-necked wading birds with long, stout bills. Storks are mute, but bill-clattering is an important mode of communication at the nest. Their nests can be large and may be reused for many years. Many species are migratory.

- Jabiru, Jabiru mycteria
- Wood stork, Mycteria americana

== Frigatebirds ==
Order: Suliformes Family: Fregatidae

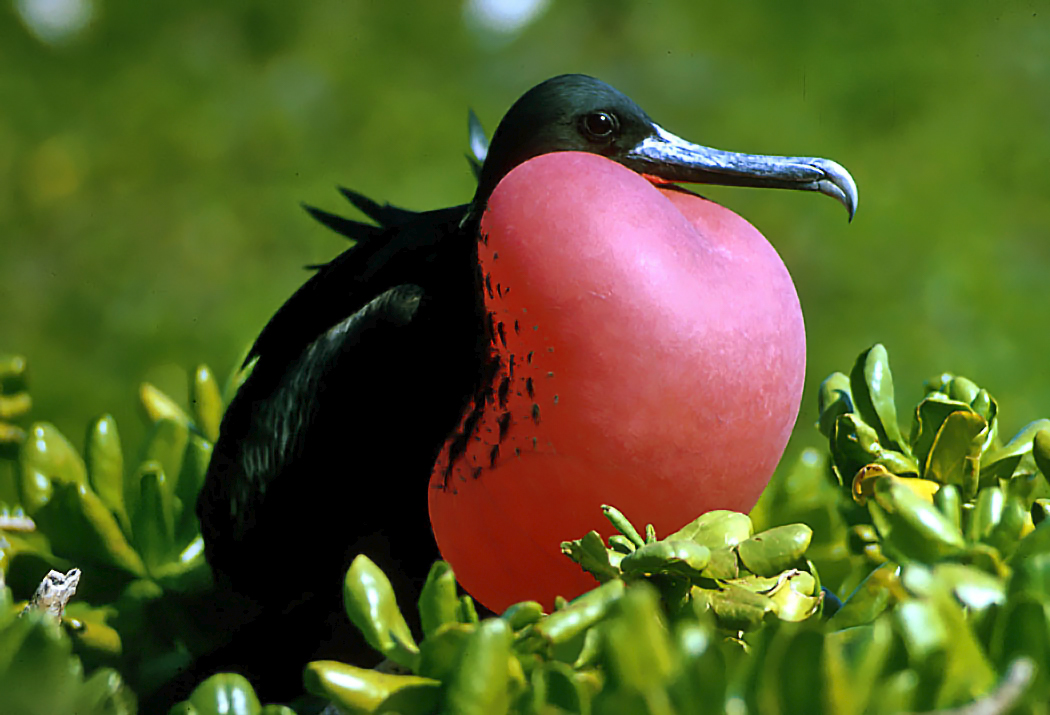
Magnificent frigatebird

Frigatebirds are large seabirds usually found over tropical oceans. They are large, black-and-white, or completely black, with long wings and deeply forked tails. The males have colored inflatable throat pouches which are usually red. They do not swim or walk and cannot take off from a flat surface. Having the largest wingspan-to-body-weight ratio of any bird, they are essentially aerial, able to stay aloft for more than a week.

- Magnificent frigatebird, Fregata magnificens

== Boobies and gannets ==
Order: Suliformes Family: Sulidae

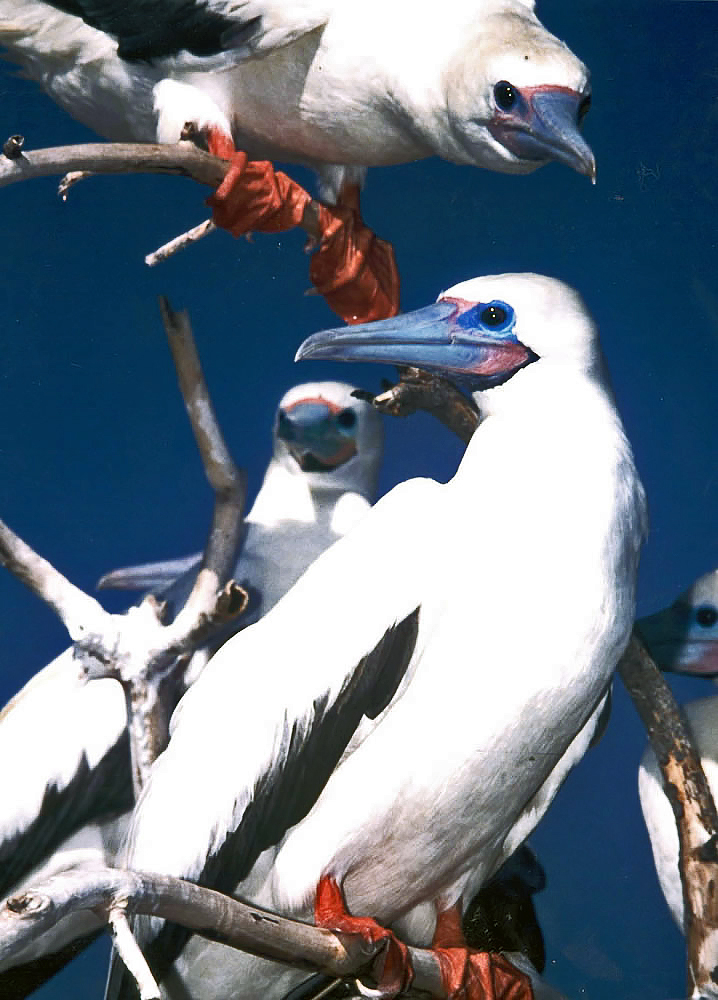
Red-footed booby

The sulids comprise the gannets and boobies. Both groups are medium to large coastal seabirds that plunge-dive for fish.

- Masked booby, Sula dactylatra (A)
- Brown booby, Sula leucogaster
- Red-footed booby, Sula sula

== Anhingas ==
Order: Suliformes Family: Anhingidae

Anhingas are often called "snake-birds" because of their long thin neck, which gives a snake-like appearance when they swim with their bodies submerged. The males have black and dark-brown plumage, an erectile crest on the nape, and a larger bill than the female. The females have much paler plumage especially on the neck and underparts. The anhingas have completely webbed feet and their legs are short and set far back on the body. Their plumage is somewhat permeable, like that of cormorants, and they spread their wings to dry after diving.

- Anhinga, Anhinga anhinga

== Cormorants and shags ==
Order: Suliformes Family: Phalacrocoracidae

Phalacrocoracidae is a family of medium to large coastal, fish-eating seabirds that includes cormorants and shags. Plumage coloration varies, with the majority having mainly dark plumage, some species being black-and-white, and a few being colorful.

- Double-crested cormorant, Nannopterum auritum
- Neotropic cormorant, Nannopterum brasilianum

== Pelicans ==
Order: Pelecaniformes Family: Pelecanidae

Pelicans are large water birds with a distinctive pouch under their beak. As with other members of the order Pelecaniformes, they have webbed feet with four toes.

- American white pelican, Pelecanus erythrorhynchos
- Brown pelican, Pelecanus occidentalis

== Herons, egrets, and bitterns ==
Order: Pelecaniformes Family: Ardeidae

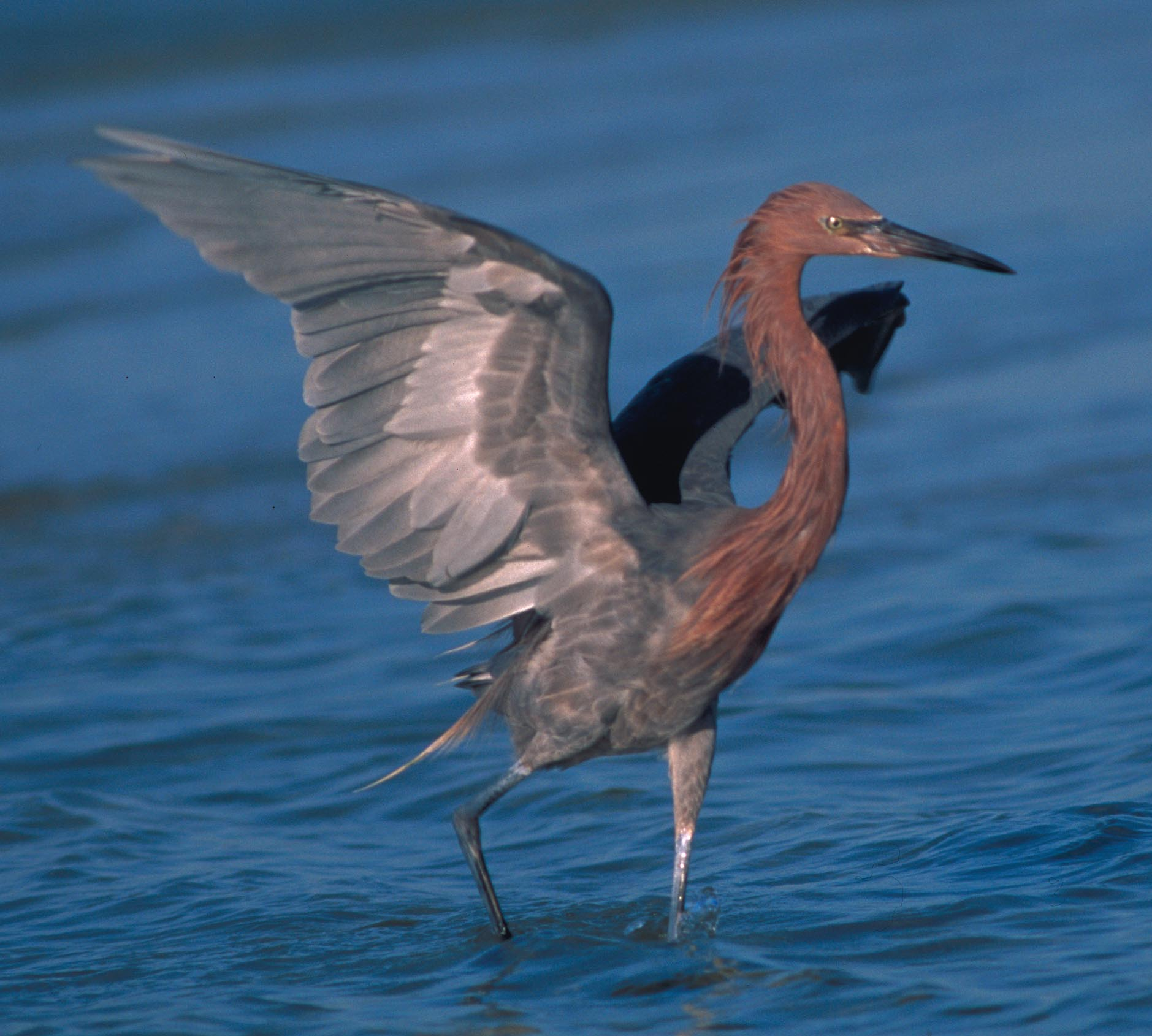
Reddish egret

The family Ardeidae contains the bitterns, herons, and egrets. Herons and egrets are medium to large wading birds with long necks and legs. Bitterns tend to be shorter necked and more wary. Members of Ardeidae fly with their necks retracted, unlike other long-necked birds such as storks, ibises, and spoonbills.

- Pinnated bittern, Botaurus pinnatus
- American bittern, Botaurus lentiginosus
- Least bittern, Ixobrychus exilis
- Bare-throated tiger-heron, Tigrisoma mexicanum
- Great blue heron, Ardea herodias
- Great egret, Ardea alba
- Snowy egret, Egretta thula
- Little blue heron, Egretta caerulea
- Tricolored heron, Egretta tricolor
- Reddish egret, Egretta rufescens (near-threatened)
- Cattle egret, Bubulcus ibis
- Green heron, Butorides virescens
- Agami heron, Agamia agami (vulnerable)
- Whistling heron, Syrigma sibilatrix (A)
- Black-crowned night-heron, Nycticorax nycticorax
- Yellow-crowned night-heron, Nyctanassa violacea
- Boat-billed heron, Cochlearius cochlearius

== Ibises and spoonbills ==
Order: Pelecaniformes Family: Threskiornithidae

Threskiornithidae is a family of large terrestrial and wading birds which includes the ibises and spoonbills. They have long, broad wings with 11 primary and about 20 secondary feathers. They are strong fliers and despite their size and weight, very capable soarers.

- White ibis, Eudocimus albus
- Scarlet ibis, Eudocimus ruber (A)
- Glossy ibis, Plegadis falcinellus
- White-faced ibis, Plegadis chihi (A)
- Roseate spoonbill, Platalea ajaja

== New World vultures ==
Order: Cathartiformes Family: Cathartidae

The New World vultures are not closely related to Old World vultures, but superficially resemble them because of convergent evolution. Like the Old World vultures, they are scavengers. However, unlike Old World vultures, which find carcasses by sight, New World vultures have a good sense of smell with which they locate carrion.

- King vulture, Sarcoramphus papa
- Black vulture, Coragyps atratus
- Turkey vulture, Cathartes aura
- Lesser yellow-headed vulture, Cathartes burrovianus

== Osprey ==
Order: Accipitriformes Family: Pandionidae

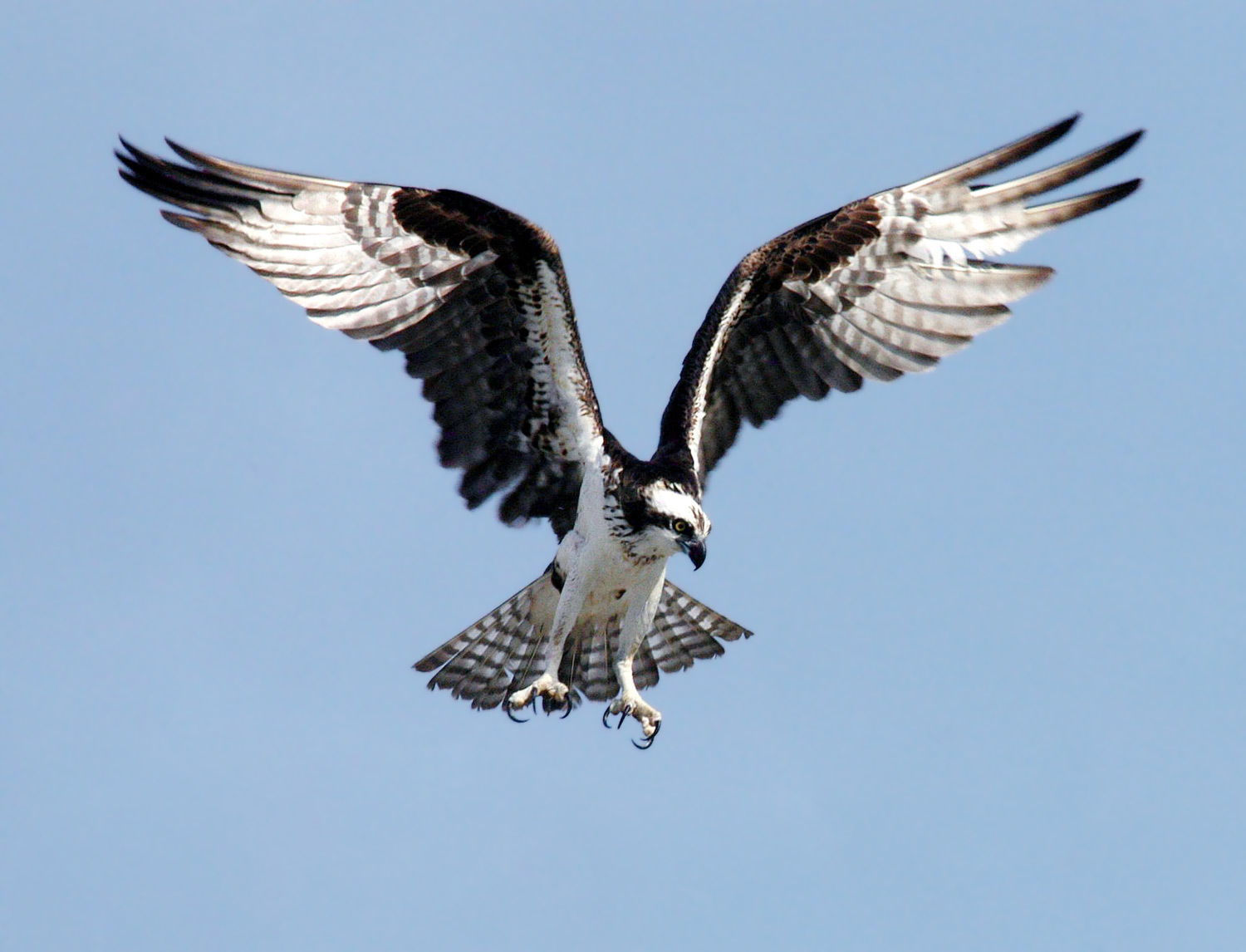
Osprey

The family Pandionidae contains only one species, the osprey. The osprey is a medium-large raptor which is a specialist fish-eater with a worldwide distribution.

- Osprey, Pandion haliaetus

== Hawks, eagles, and kites ==
Order: Accipitriformes Family: Accipitridae

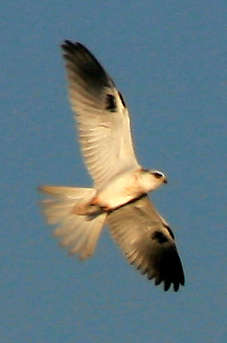
White-tailed kite

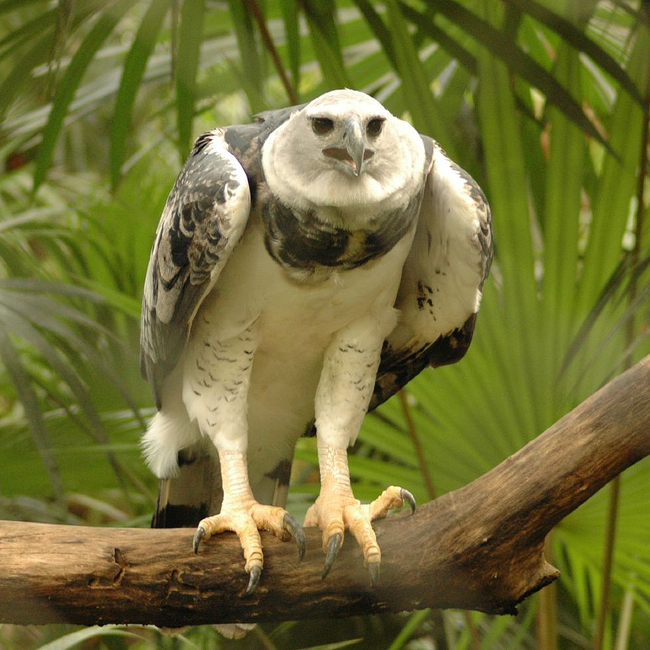
Immature harpy eagle

Accipitridae is a family of birds of prey which includes hawks, eagles, kites, harriers, and Old World vultures. These birds have powerful hooked beaks for tearing flesh from their prey, strong legs, powerful talons, and keen eyesight.

- White-tailed kite, Elanus leucurus
- Hook-billed kite, Chondrohierax uncinatus
- Gray-headed kite, Leptodon cayanensis
- Swallow-tailed kite, Elanoides forficatus
- Crested eagle, Morphnus guianensis (near-threatened)
- Harpy eagle, Harpia harpyja (near-threatened)
- Black hawk-eagle, Spizaetus tyrannus
- Black-and-white hawk-eagle, Spizaetus melanoleucus
- Ornate hawk-eagle, Spizaetus ornatus (near-threatened)
- Double-toothed kite, Harpagus bidentatus
- Northern harrier, Circus hudsonius
- Tiny hawk, Accipiter superciliosus (A)
- Sharp-shinned hawk, Accipiter striatus
- Cooper's hawk, Accipiter cooperii
- Bicolored hawk, Accipiter bicolor
- Bald eagle, Haliaeetus leucocephalus (A)
- Mississippi kite, Ictinia mississippiensis
- Plumbeous kite, Ictinia plumbea
- Black-collared hawk, Busarellus nigricollis
- Crane hawk, Geranospiza caerulescens
- Snail kite, Rostrhamus sociabilis
- Common black hawk, Buteogallus anthracinus
- Great black hawk, Buteogallus urubitinga
- Solitary eagle, Buteogallus solitarius (near-threatened)
- Roadside hawk, Rupornis magnirostris
- White-tailed hawk, Geranoaetus albicaudatus
- White hawk, Pseudastur albicollis
- Gray hawk, Buteo plagiatus
- Broad-winged hawk, Buteo platypterus
- Short-tailed hawk, Buteo brachyurus
- Swainson's hawk, Buteo swainsoni
- Zone-tailed hawk, Buteo albonotatus
- Red-tailed hawk, Buteo jamaicensis

== Barn-owls ==
Order: Strigiformes Family: Tytonidae

Barn-owls are medium to large owls with large heads and characteristic heart-shaped faces. They have long strong legs with powerful talons.

- Barn owl, Tyto alba

== Owls ==
Order: Strigiformes Family: Strigidae

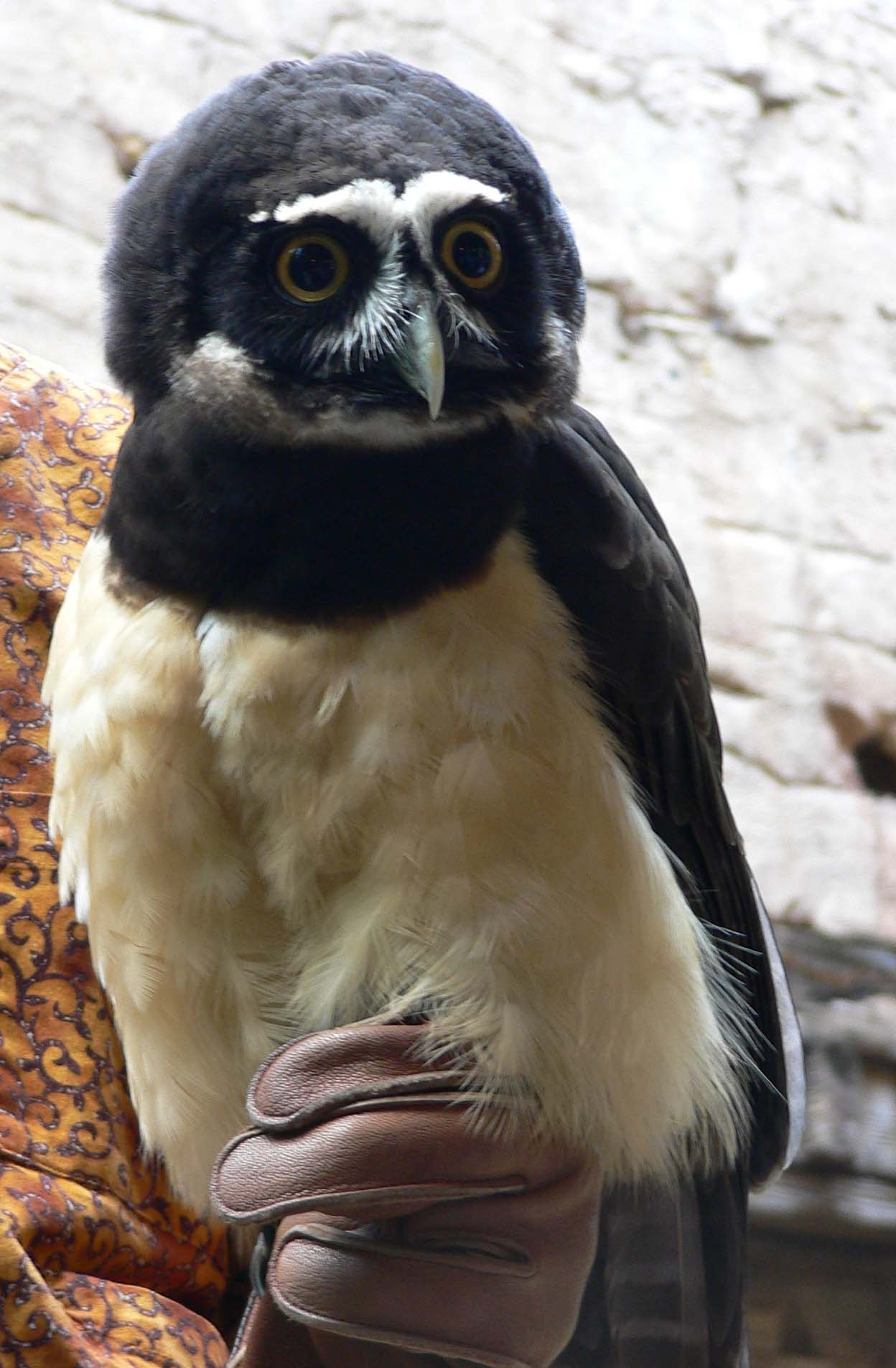
Spectacled owl

The typical owls are small to large solitary nocturnal birds of prey. They have large forward-facing eyes and ears, a hawk-like beak, and a conspicuous circle of feathers around each eye called a facial disk.

- Middle-American screech-owl, Megascops guatemalae
- Crested owl, Lophostrix cristata
- Spectacled owl, Pulsatrix perspicillata
- Great horned owl, Bubo virginianus
- Central American pygmy-owl, Glaucidium griseiceps
- Ferruginous pygmy-owl, Glaucidium brasilianum
- Burrowing owl, Athene cunicularia
- Mottled owl, Strix virgata
- Black-and-white owl, Strix nigrolineata
- Stygian owl, Asio stygius
- Short-eared owl, Asio flammeus (A)
- Striped owl, Asio clamator

== Trogons ==
Order: Trogoniformes Family: Trogonidae

The family Trogonidae includes trogons and quetzals. Found in tropical woodlands worldwide, they feed on insects and fruit, and their broad bills and weak legs reflect their diet and arboreal habits. Although their flight is fast, they are reluctant to fly any distance. Trogons have soft, often colorful, feathers with distinctive male and female plumage.

- Slaty-tailed trogon, Trogon massena
- Black-headed trogon, Trogon melanocephalus
- Gartered trogon, Trogon caligatus
- Collared trogon, Trogon collaris

== Motmots ==
Order: Coraciiformes Family: Momotidae

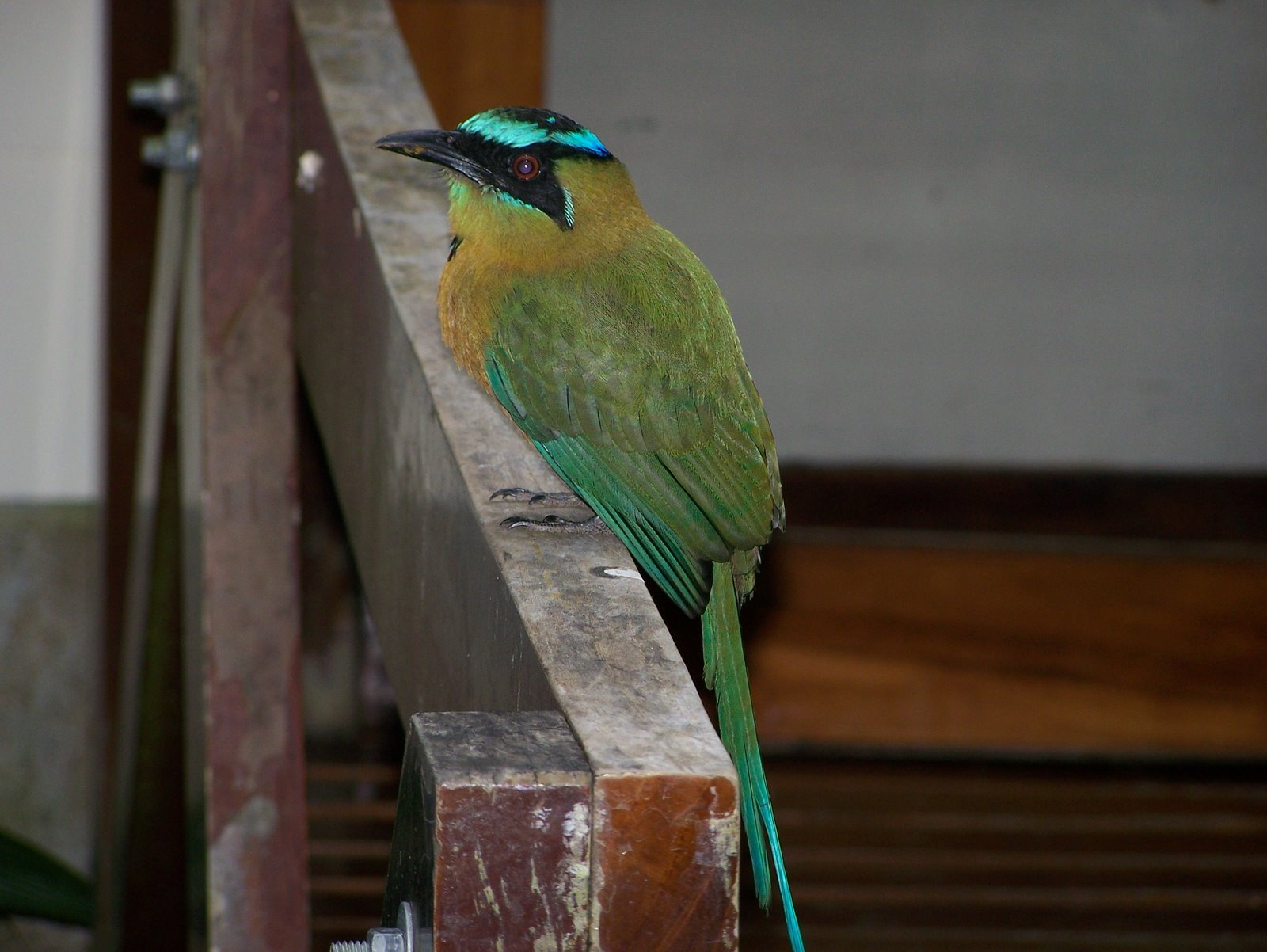
Lesson's motmot

The motmots have colorful plumage and long, graduated tails which they display by waggling back and forth. In most of the species, the barbs near the ends of the two longest (central) tail feathers are weak and fall off, leaving a length of bare shaft and creating a racket-shaped tail.

- Tody motmot, Hylomanes momotula
- Lesson's motmot, Momotus lessonii
- Keel-billed motmot, Electron carinatum (vulnerable)

== Kingfishers ==
Order: Coraciiformes Family: Alcedinidae

Kingfishers are medium-sized birds with large heads, long, pointed bills, short legs, and stubby tails.

- Ringed kingfisher, Megaceryle torquatus
- Belted kingfisher, Megaceryle alcyon
- Amazon kingfisher, Chloroceryle amazona
- American pygmy kingfisher, Chloroceryle aenea
- Green kingfisher, Chloroceryle americana

== Puffbirds ==
Order: Piciformes Family: Bucconidae

The puffbirds are related to the jacamars and have the same range, but lack the iridescent colors of that family. They are mainly brown, rufous, or gray, with large heads and flattened bills with hooked tips. The loose abundant plumage and short tails makes them look stout and puffy, giving rise to the English common name of the family.

- White-necked puffbird, Notharchus hyperrhynchus
- White-whiskered puffbird, Malacoptila panamensis

== Jacamars ==
Order: Piciformes Family: Galbulidae

The jacamars are near passerine birds from tropical South America with a range that extends up to Mexico. They feed on insects caught on the wing, and are glossy, elegant birds with long bills and tails. In appearance and behavior they resemble the Old World bee-eaters, although they are more closely related to puffbirds.

- Rufous-tailed jacamar, Galbula ruficauda

== Toucans ==
Order: Piciformes Family: Ramphastidae

Toucans are near passerine birds from the Neotropics. They are brightly marked and have enormous, colorful bills which in some species amount to half their body length. The keel-billed toucan is the National Bird.

- Northern emerald-toucanet, Aulacorhynchus prasinus
- Collared aracari, Pteroglossus torquatus
- Keel-billed toucan, Ramphastos sulfuratus

== Woodpeckers ==
Order: Piciformes Family: Picidae

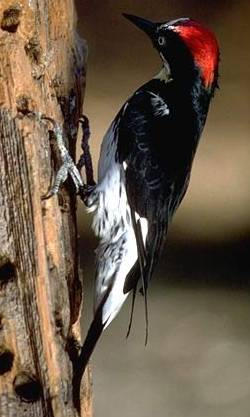
Acorn woodpecker

Woodpeckers are small to medium-sized birds with chisel-like beaks, short legs, stiff tails, and long tongues used for capturing insects. Some species have feet with two toes pointing forward and two backward, while several species have only three toes. Many woodpeckers have the habit of tapping noisily on tree trunks with their beaks.

- Acorn woodpecker, Melanerpes formicivorus
- Black-cheeked woodpecker, Melanerpes pucherani
- Yucatan woodpecker, Melanerpes pygmaeus
- Golden-fronted woodpecker, Melanerpes aurifrons
- Yellow-bellied sapsucker, Sphyrapicus varius
- Ladder-backed woodpecker, Dryobates scalaris
- Smoky-brown woodpecker, Dryobates fumigatus
- Golden-olive woodpecker, Colaptes rubiginosus
- Chestnut-colored woodpecker, Celeus castaneus
- Lineated woodpecker, Dryocopus lineatus
- Pale-billed woodpecker, Campephilus guatemalensis

== Falcons and caracaras ==
Order: Falconiformes Family: Falconidae

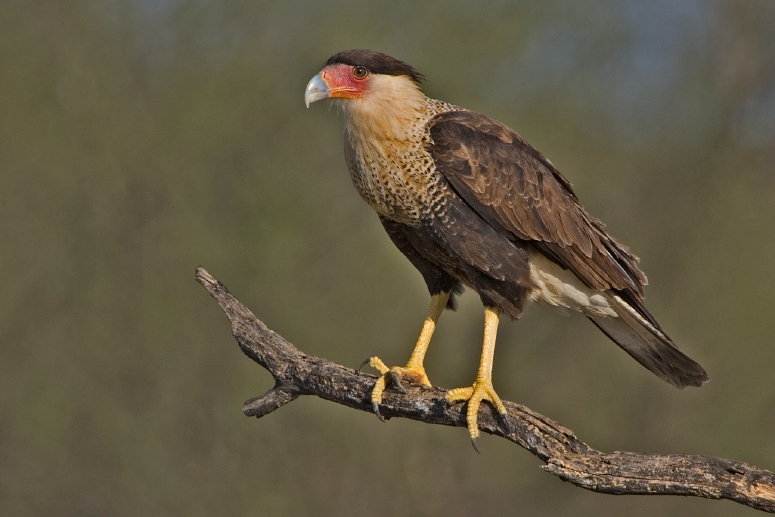
Crested caracara

Falconidae is a family of diurnal birds of prey. They differ from hawks, eagles and kites in that they kill with their beaks instead of their talons.

- Laughing falcon, Herpetotheres cachinnans
- Barred forest-falcon, Micrastur ruficollis
- Collared forest-falcon, Micrastur semitorquatus
- Crested caracara, Caracara plancus
- Yellow-headed caracara, Milvago chimachima (A)
- American kestrel, Falco sparverius
- Merlin, Falco columbarius
- Aplomado falcon, Falco femoralis
- Bat falcon, Falco rufigularis
- Orange-breasted falcon, Falco deiroleucus (near-threatened)
- Peregrine falcon, Falco peregrinus

== New World and African parrots ==
Order: Psittaciformes Family: Psittacidae

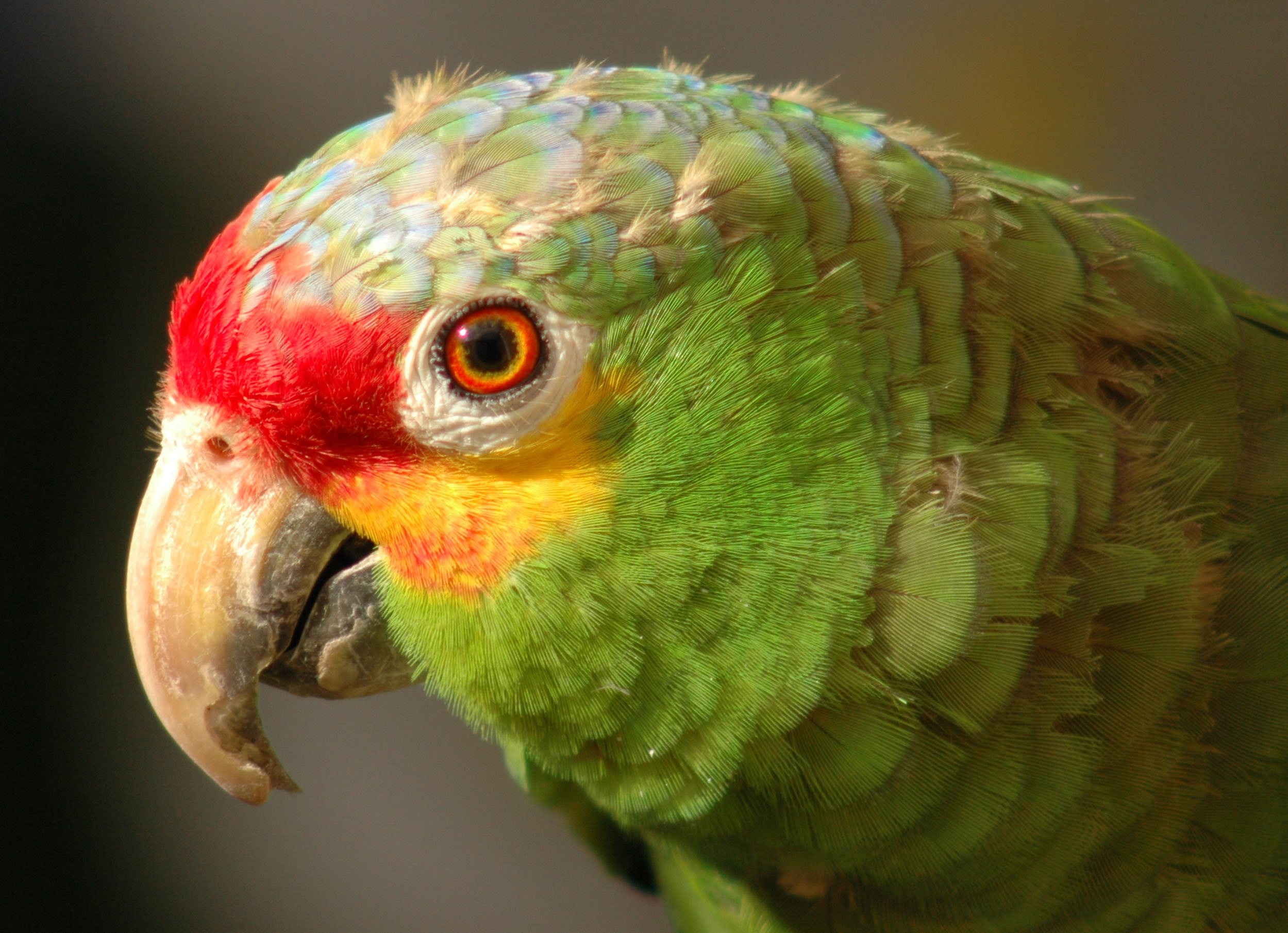
Red-lored parrot

Parrots are small to large birds with a characteristic curved beak. Their upper mandibles have slight mobility in the joint with the skull and they have a generally erect stance. All parrots are zygodactyl, having the four toes on each foot placed two at the front and two to the back.

- Olive-throated parakeet, Eupsittula nana
- Scarlet macaw, Ara macao
- Green parakeet, Psittacara holochlorus (A)
- Brown-hooded parrot, Pyrilia haematotis
- White-crowned parrot, Pionus senilis
- White-fronted parrot, Amazona albifrons
- Yellow-lored parrot, Amazona xantholora
- Red-lored parrot, Amazona autumnalis
- Mealy parrot, Amazona farinosa
- Yellow-headed parrot, Amazona oratrix (endangered)
- Yellow-naped parrot, Amazona auropalliata (A) (vulnerable)

== Manakins ==
Order: Passeriformes Family: Pipridae

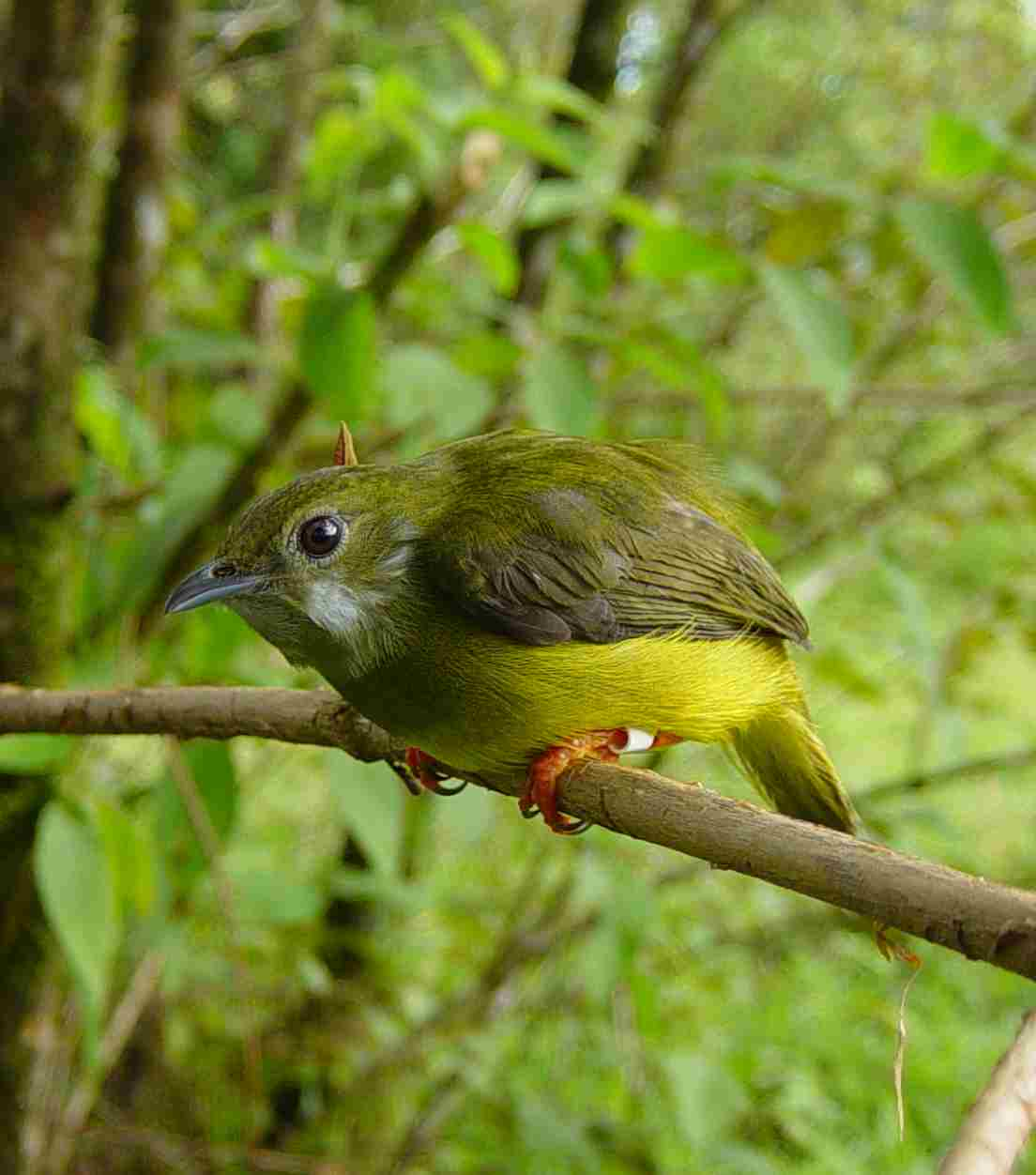
White-collared manakin

The manakins are a family of subtropical and tropical mainland Central and South America, and Trinidad and Tobago. They are compact forest birds, the males typically being brightly colored, although the females of most species are duller and usually green-plumaged. Manakins feed on small fruits, berries, and insects.

- White-collared manakin, Manacus candei
- Red-capped manakin, Ceratopipra mentalis

== Cotingas ==
Order: Passeriformes Family: Cotingidae

The cotingas are birds of forests or forest edges in tropical South America. Comparatively little is known about this diverse group, although all have broad bills with hooked tips, rounded wings, and strong legs. The males of many of the species are brightly colored or decorated with plumes or wattles.

- Lovely cotinga, Cotinga amabilis
- Rufous piha, Lipaugus unirufus

== Tityras and allies ==
Order: Passeriformes Family: Tityridae

Tityridae is family of suboscine passerine birds found in forest and woodland in the Neotropics. The approximately 30 species in this family were formerly lumped with the families Pipridae and Cotingidae (see Taxonomy).

- Northern schiffornis, Schiffornis veraepacis
- Speckled mourner, Laniocera rufescens
- Masked tityra, Tityra semifasciata
- Black-crowned tityra, Tityra inquisitor
- Cinnamon becard, Pachyramphus cinnamomeus
- White-winged becard, Pachyramphus polychopterus
- Gray-collared becard, Pachyramphus major
- Rose-throated becard, Pachyramphus aglaiae

== Royal flycatcher and allies ==
Order: Passeriformes Family: Onychorhynchidae

The members of this small family, created in 2018, were formerly considered to be tyrant flycatchers, family Tyrannidae.

- Royal flycatcher, Onychorhynchus coronatus
- Ruddy-tailed flycatcher, Terenotriccus erythrurus
- Sulphur-rumped flycatcher, Myiobius sulphureipygius

== Tyrant flycatchers ==
Order: Passeriformes Family: Tyrannidae

Tyrant flycatchers are passerine birds which occur throughout North and South America. They superficially resemble the Old World flycatchers, but are more robust and have stronger bills. They do not have the sophisticated vocal capabilities of the songbirds. Most, but not all, have plain coloring. As the name implies, most are insectivorous.

- Stub-tailed spadebill, Platyrinchus cancrominus
- Ochre-bellied flycatcher, Mionectes oleagineus
- Sepia-capped flycatcher, Leptopogon amaurocephalus
- Northern bentbill, Oncostoma cinereigulare
- Slate-headed tody-flycatcher, Poecilotriccus sylvia
- Common tody-flycatcher, Todirostrum cinereum
- Eye-ringed flatbill, Rhynchocyclus brevirostris
- Yellow-olive flycatcher, Tolmomyias sulphurescens
- Yellow-bellied tyrannulet, Ornithion semiflavum
- Northern beardless-tyrannulet, Camptostoma imberbe
- Greenish elaenia, Myiopagis viridicata
- Caribbean elaenia, Elaenia martinica (A)
- Yellow-bellied elaenia, Elaenia flavogaster
- Guatemalan tyrannulet, Zimmerius vilissimus (A)
- Mistletoe tyrannulet, Zimmerius parvus
- Bright-rumped attila, Attila spadiceus
- Rufous mourner, Rhytipterna holerythra
- Yucatan flycatcher, Myiarchus yucatanensis
- Dusky-capped flycatcher, Myiarchus tuberculifer
- Great crested flycatcher, Myiarchus crinitus
- Brown-crested flycatcher, Myiarchus tyrannulus
- Great kiskadee, Pitangus sulphuratus
- Boat-billed flycatcher, Megarynchus pitangua
- Social flycatcher, Myiozetetes similis
- Streaked flycatcher, Myiodynastes maculatus
- Sulphur-bellied flycatcher, Myiodynastes luteiventris
- Piratic flycatcher, Legatus leucophaius
- Tropical kingbird, Tyrannus melancholicus
- Couch's kingbird, Tyrannus couchii
- Cassin's kingbird, Tyrannus vociferans (A)
- Western kingbird, Tyrannus verticalis
- Eastern kingbird, Tyrannus tyrannus
- Gray kingbird, Tyrannus dominicensis
- Scissor-tailed flycatcher, Tyrannus forficatus
- Fork-tailed flycatcher, Tyrannus savana
- Olive-sided flycatcher, Contopus cooperi (near-threatened)
- Greater pewee, Contopus pertinax
- Western wood-pewee, Contopus sordidulus (A)
- Eastern wood-pewee, Contopus virens
- Tropical pewee, Contopus cinereus
- Yellow-bellied flycatcher, Empidonax flaviventris
- Acadian flycatcher, Empidonax virescens
- Alder flycatcher, Empidonax alnorum
- Willow flycatcher, Empidonax traillii
- White-throated flycatcher, Empidonax albigularis
- Least flycatcher, Empidonax minimus
- Black phoebe, Sayornis nigricans
- Eastern phoebe, Sayornis phoebe (A)
- Say's phoebe, Sayornis saya (A)
- Vermilion flycatcher, Pyrocephalus rubinus
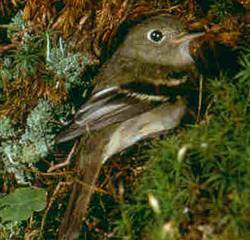
Yellow-bellied flycatcher

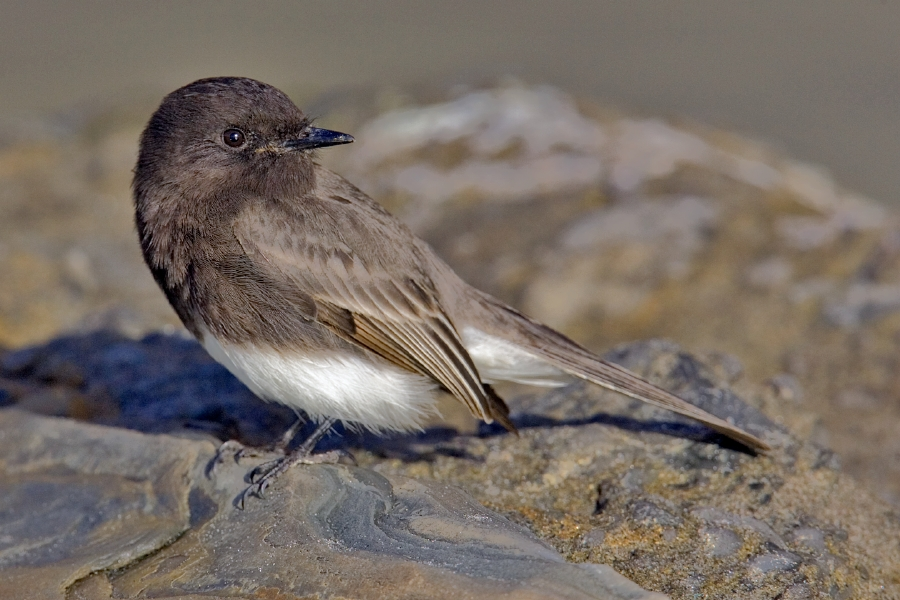
Black phoebe

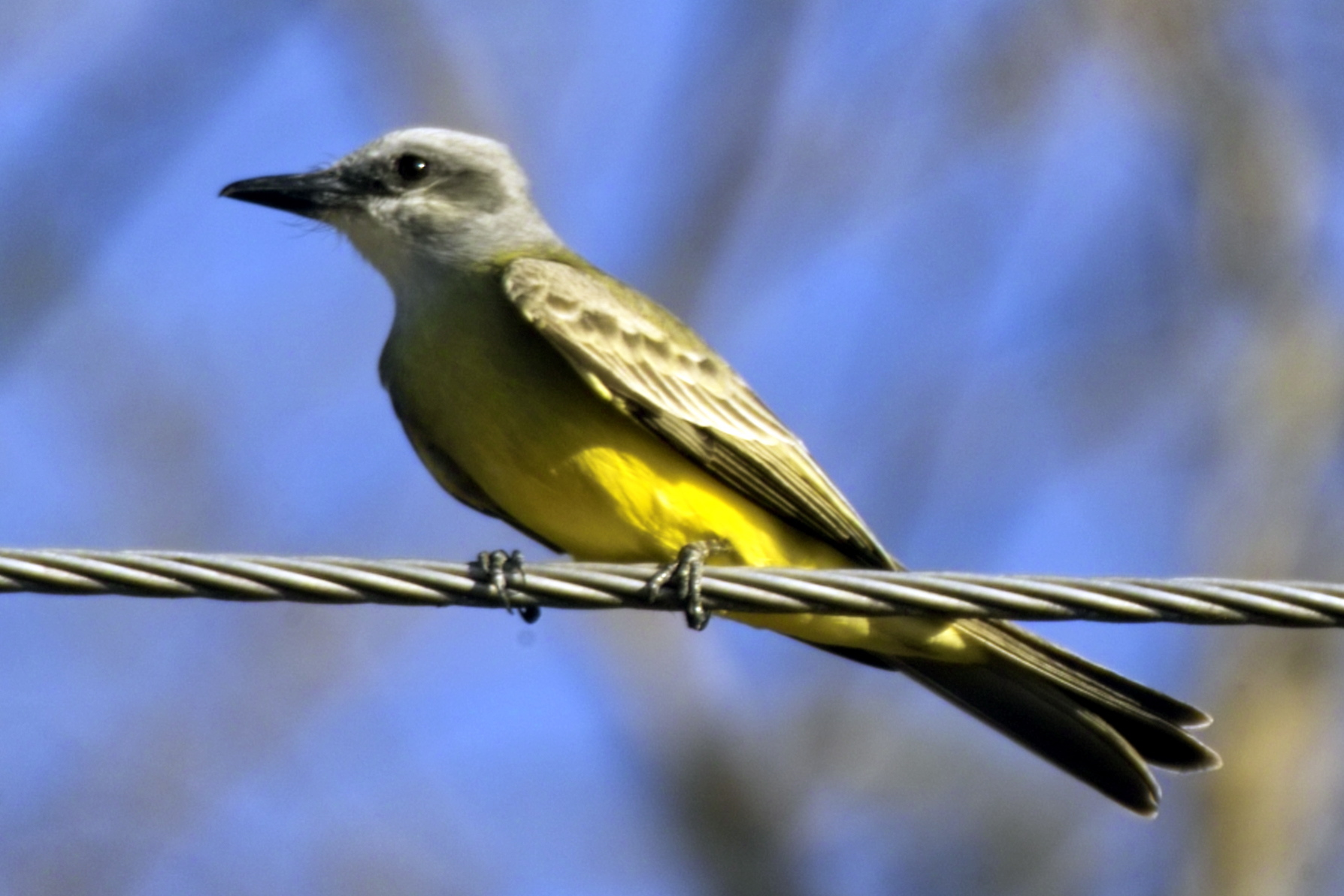
Tropical kingbird

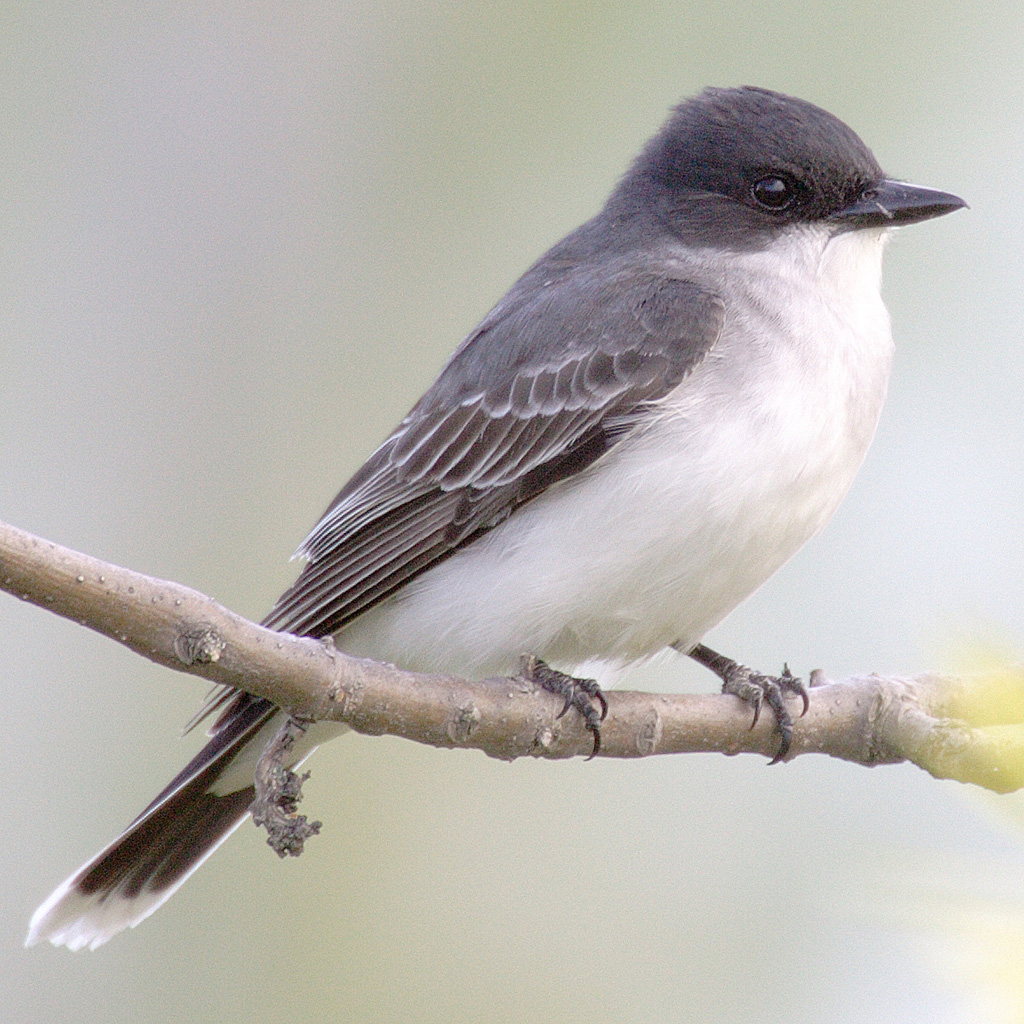
Eastern kingbird

== Typical antbirds ==
Order: Passeriformes Family: Thamnophilidae

The antbirds are a large family of small passerine birds of subtropical and tropical Central and South America. They are forest birds which tend to feed on insects at or near the ground. A sizable minority of them specialize in following columns of army ants to eat small invertebrates that leave their hiding places to flee from the ants. Many species lack bright color with brown, black, and white being the dominant tones.

- Great antshrike, Taraba major
- Barred antshrike, Thamnophilus doliatus
- Black-crowned antshrike, Thamnophilus atrinucha
- Russet antshrike, Thamnistes anabatinus
- Plain antvireo, Dysithamnus mentalis
- Slaty antwren, Myrmotherula schisticolor
- Dot-winged antwren, Microrhopias quixensis
- Dusky antbird, Cercomacroides tyrannina
- Bare-crowned antbird, Gymnocichla nudiceps

== Antthrushes ==
Order: Passeriformes Family: Formicariidae Antthrushes resemble small rails with strong, longish legs, very short tails, and stout bills.

- Mayan antthrush, Formicarius moniliger

== Ovenbirds and woodcreepers ==
Order: Passeriformes Family: Furnariidae

Ovenbirds comprise a large family of small sub-oscine passerine bird species found in Central and South America. They are a diverse group of insectivores which gets its name from the elaborate "oven-like" clay nests built by some species, although others build stick nests or nest in tunnels or clefts in rock. The woodcreepers are brownish birds which maintain an upright vertical posture, supported by their stiff tail vanes. They feed mainly on insects taken from tree trunks.

- Middle American leaftosser, Sclerurus mexicanus
- Scaly-throated leaftosser, Sclerurus guatemalensis
- Olivaceous woodcreeper, Sittasomus griseicapillus
- Ruddy woodcreeper, Dendrocincla homochroa
- Tawny-winged woodcreeper, Dendrocincla anabatina
- Wedge-billed woodcreeper, Glyphorynchus spirurus
- Northern barred-woodcreeper, Dendrocolaptes sanctithomae
- Strong-billed woodcreeper, Xiphocolaptes promeropirhynchus
- Ivory-billed woodcreeper, Xiphorhynchus flavigaster
- Spotted woodcreeper, Xiphorhynchus erythropygius
- Streak-headed woodcreeper, Lepidocolaptes souleyetii
- Plain xenops, Xenops minutus
- Scaly-throated foliage-gleaner, Anabacerthia variegaticeps (A)
- Buff-throated foliage-gleaner, Automolus ochrolaemus
- Rufous-breasted spinetail, Synallaxis erythrothorax

== Vireos, shrike-babblers, and erpornis ==
Order: Passeriformes Family: Vireonidae

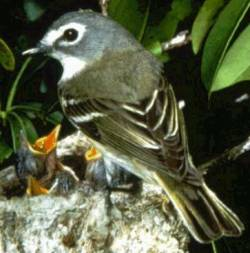
Blue-headed vireo

The vireos are a group of small to medium-sized passerine birds. They are typically greenish in color and resemble wood-warblers apart from their heavier bills.

- Rufous-browed peppershrike, Cyclarhis gujanensis
- Green shrike-vireo, Vireolanius pulchellus
- Tawny-crowned greenlet, Tunchiornis ochraceiceps
- Lesser greenlet, Pachysylvia decurtata
- White-eyed vireo, Vireo griseus
- Mangrove vireo, Vireo pallens
- Bell's vireo, Vireo bellii (A)
- Yellow-throated vireo, Vireo flavifrons
- Blue-headed vireo, Vireo solitarius
- Plumbeous vireo, Vireo plumbeus
- Philadelphia vireo, Vireo philadelphicus
- Warbling vireo, Vireo gilvus (A)
- Red-eyed vireo, Vireo olivaceus
- Yellow-green vireo, Vireo flavoviridis
- Black-whiskered vireo, Vireo altiloquus (A)
- Yucatan vireo, Vireo magister

== Crows, jays, and magpies ==
Order: Passeriformes Family: Corvidae

The family Corvidae includes crows, ravens, jays, choughs, magpies, treepies, nutcrackers, and ground jays. Corvids are above average in size among the Passeriformes, and some of the larger species show high levels of intelligence.

- Brown jay, Psilorhinus morio
- Green jay, Cyanocorax yncas
- Yucatan jay, Cyanocorax yucatanicus

== Swallows ==
Order: Passeriformes Family: Hirundinidae

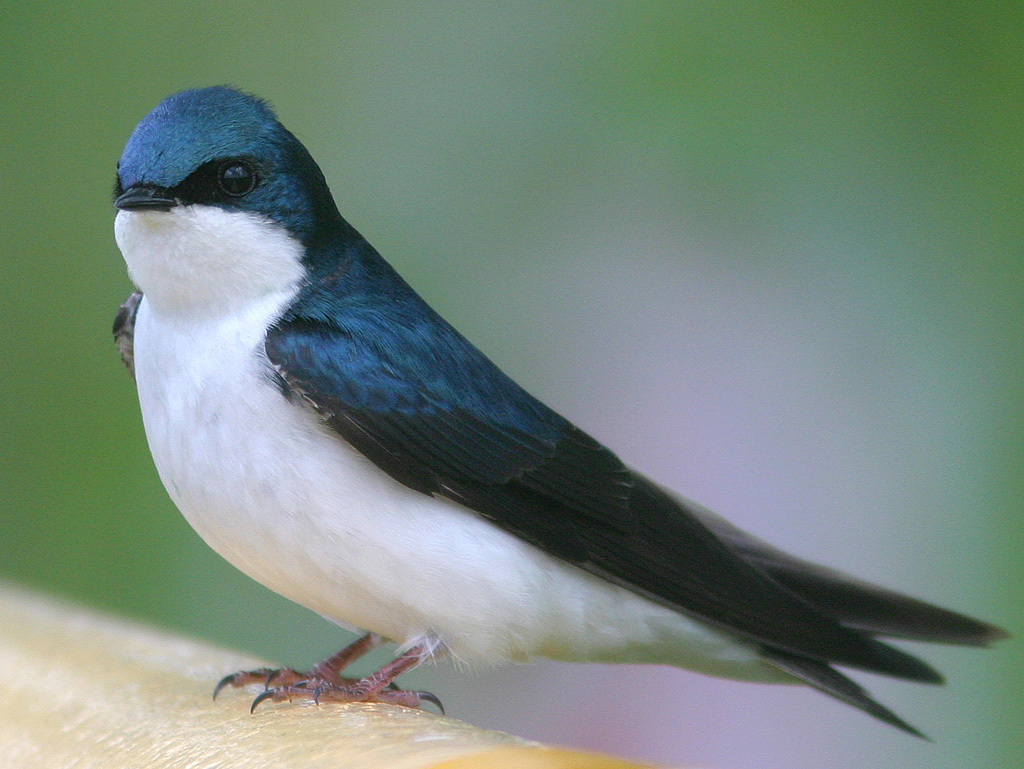
Tree swallow

The family Hirundinidae is adapted to aerial feeding. They have a slender streamlined body, long pointed wings, and a short bill with a wide gape. The feet are adapted to perching rather than walking, and the front toes are partially joined at the base.

- Bank swallow, Riparia riparia
- Tree swallow, Tachycineta bicolor
- Violet-green swallow, Tachycineta thalassina (A)
- Mangrove swallow, Tachycineta albilinea
- Northern rough-winged swallow, Stelgidopteryx serripennis
- Brown-chested martin, Progne tapera (A)
- Purple martin, Progne subis
- Gray-breasted martin, Progne chalybea
- Sinaloa martin, Progne sinaloae (A) (vulnerable)
- Barn swallow, Hirundo rustica
- Cliff swallow, Petrochelidon pyrrhonota
- Cave swallow, Petrochelidon fulva

== Kinglets ==
Order: Passeriformes Family: Regulidae

The kinglets and "crests" are a small family of birds which resemble some warblers. They are very small insectivorous birds. The adults have colored crowns, giving rise to their name.

- Ruby-crowned kinglet, Corthylio calendula (A)

== Waxwings ==
Order: Passeriformes Family: Bombycillidae

The waxwings are a group of birds with soft silky plumage and unique red tips to some of the wing feathers. In the Bohemian and cedar waxwings, these tips look like sealing wax and give the group its name. These are arboreal birds of northern forests. They live on insects in summer and berries in winter.

- Cedar waxwing, Bombycilla cedrorum

== Gnatcatchers ==
Order: Passeriformes Family: Polioptilidae

These dainty birds resemble Old World warblers in their build and habits, moving restlessly through the foliage seeking insects. The gnatcatchers and gnatwrens are mainly soft bluish gray in color and have the typical insectivore's long sharp bill. They are birds of fairly open woodland or scrub, which nest in bushes or trees.

- Long-billed gnatwren, Ramphocaenus melanurus
- White-browed gnatcatcher, Polioptila bilineata
- Blue-gray gnatcatcher, Polioptila caerulea

== Wrens ==
Order: Passeriformes Family: Troglodytidae

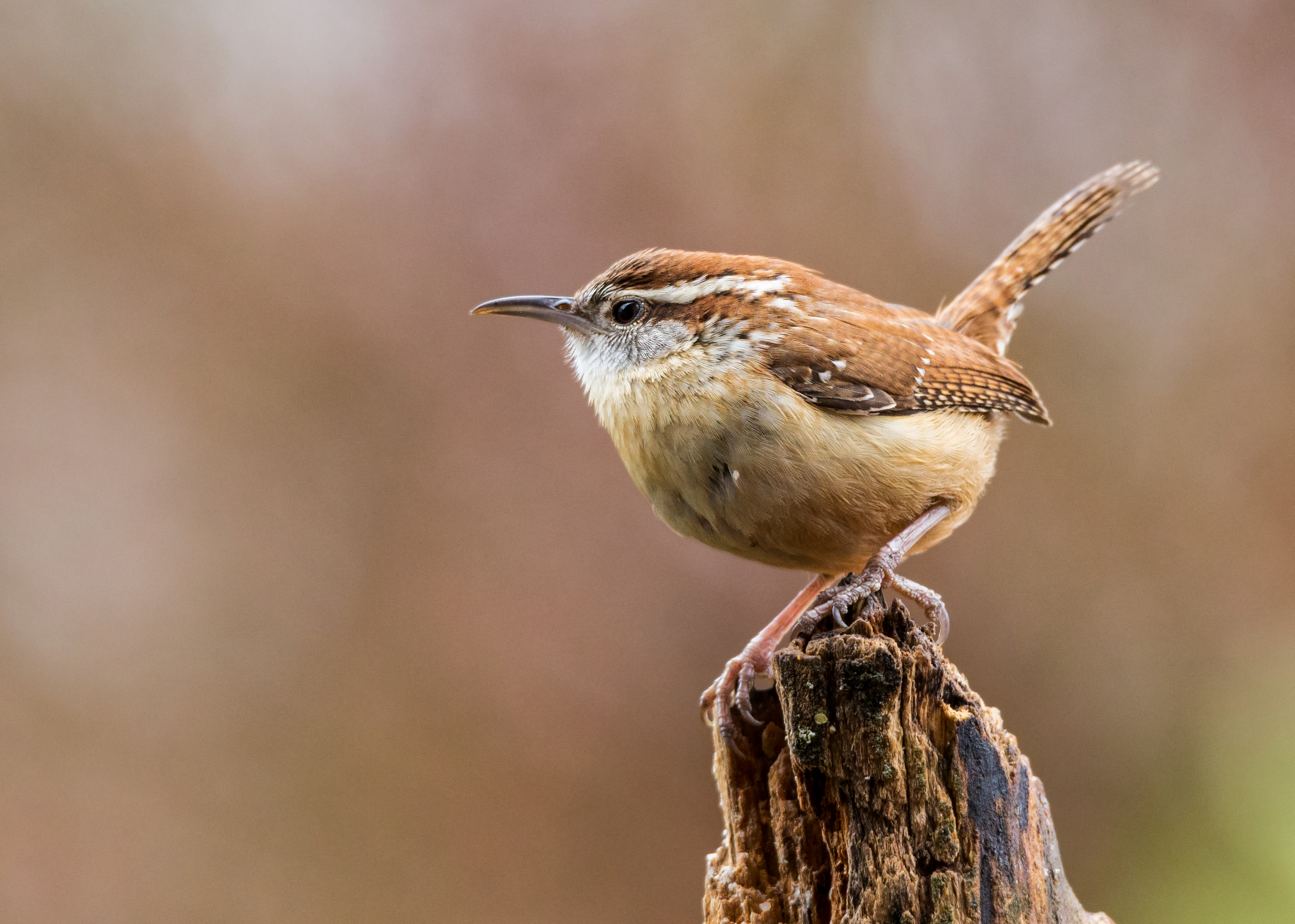
Carolina wren

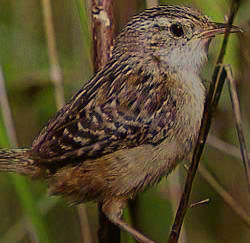
Sedge wren

The wrens are mainly small and inconspicuous except for their loud songs. These birds have short wings and thin down-turned bills. Several species often hold their tails upright. All are insectivorous.

- Nightingale wren, Microcerculus philomela
- House wren, Troglodytes aedon
- Grass wren, Cistothorus platensis
- Carolina wren, Thryothorus ludovicianus
- Band-backed wren, Campylorhynchus zonatus
- Spot-breasted wren, Pheugopedius maculipectus
- Cabanis's wren, Cantorchilus modestus
- White-bellied wren, Uropsila leucogastra
- White-breasted wood-wren, Henicorhina leucosticta
- Gray-breasted wood-wren, Henicorhina leucophrys (A)

== Mockingbirds and thrashers ==
Order: Passeriformes Family: Mimidae

The mimids are a family of passerine birds that includes thrashers, mockingbirds, tremblers, and the New World catbirds. These birds are notable for their vocalizations, especially their ability to mimic a wide variety of birds and other sounds heard outdoors. Their coloring tends towards dull grays and browns.

- Black catbird, Melanoptila glabrirostris (near-threatened)
- Gray catbird, Dumetella carolinensis
- Tropical mockingbird, Mimus gilvus
- Northern mockingbird, Mimus polyglottos (A)

== Thrushes and allies ==
Order: Passeriformes Family: Turdidae

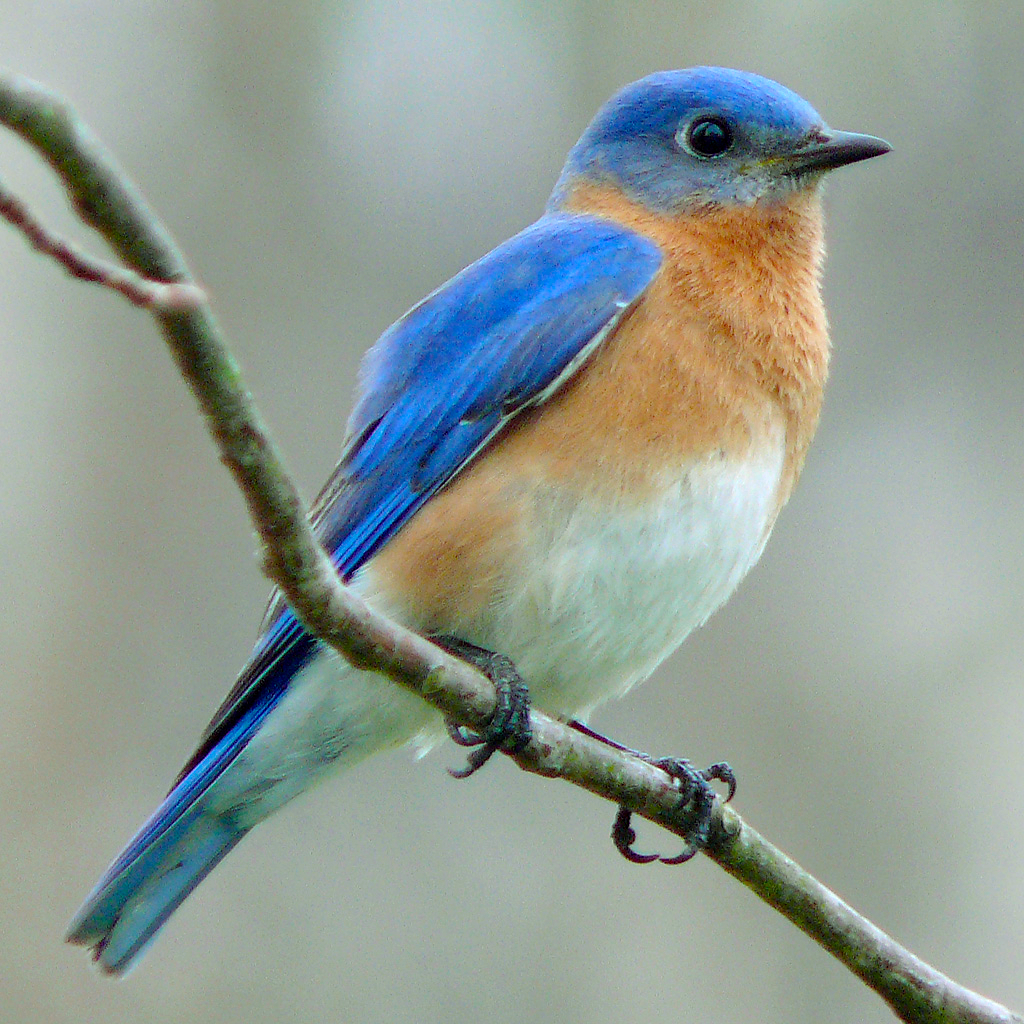
Eastern bluebird

The thrushes are a group of passerine birds that occur mainly in the Old World. They are plump, soft plumaged, small to medium-sized insectivores or sometimes omnivores, often feeding on the ground.

- Eastern bluebird, Sialia sialis
- Slate-colored solitaire, Myadestes unicolor
- Veery, Catharus fuscescens
- Gray-cheeked thrush, Catharus minimus
- Swainson's thrush, Catharus ustulatus
- Hermit thrush, Catharus guttatus (A)
- Wood thrush, Hylocichla mustelina (near-threatened)
- Clay-colored thrush, Turdus grayi
- White-throated thrush, Turdus assimilis
- American robin, Turdus migratorius (A)

== Waxbills and allies ==
Order: Passeriformes Family: Estrildidae

The members of this family are small passerine birds native to the Old World tropics. They are gregarious and often colonial seed eaters with short thick but pointed bills. They are all similar in structure and habits, but have wide variation in plumage colors and patterns.

- Tricolored munia, Lonchura malacca (I)

== Old World sparrows ==
Order: Passeriformes Family: Passeridae

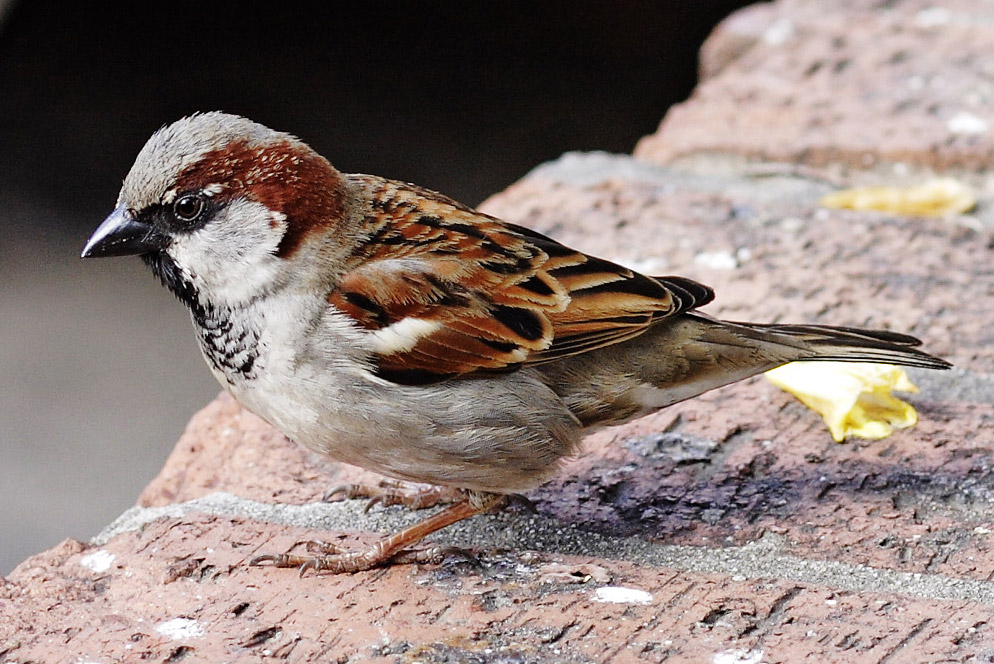
House sparrow

Sparrows are small passerine birds. In general, sparrows tend to be small, plump, brown or gray birds with short tails and short powerful beaks. Sparrows are seed eaters, but they also consume small insects.

- House sparrow, Passer domesticus (I)

== Wagtails and pipits ==
Order: Passeriformes Family: Motacillidae

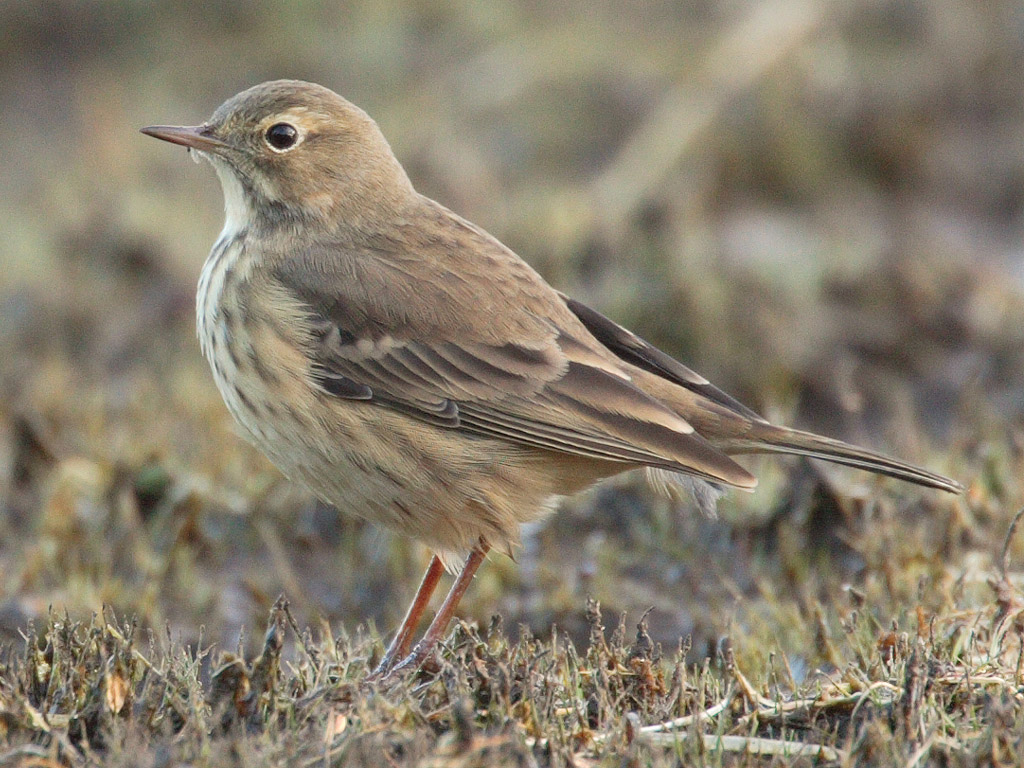
American pipit

Motacillidae is a family of small passerine birds with medium to long tails. They include the wagtails, longclaws, and pipits. They are slender ground-feeding insectivores of open country.

- American pipit, Anthus rubescens

== Finches, euphonias, and allies ==
Order: Passeriformes Family: Fringillidae

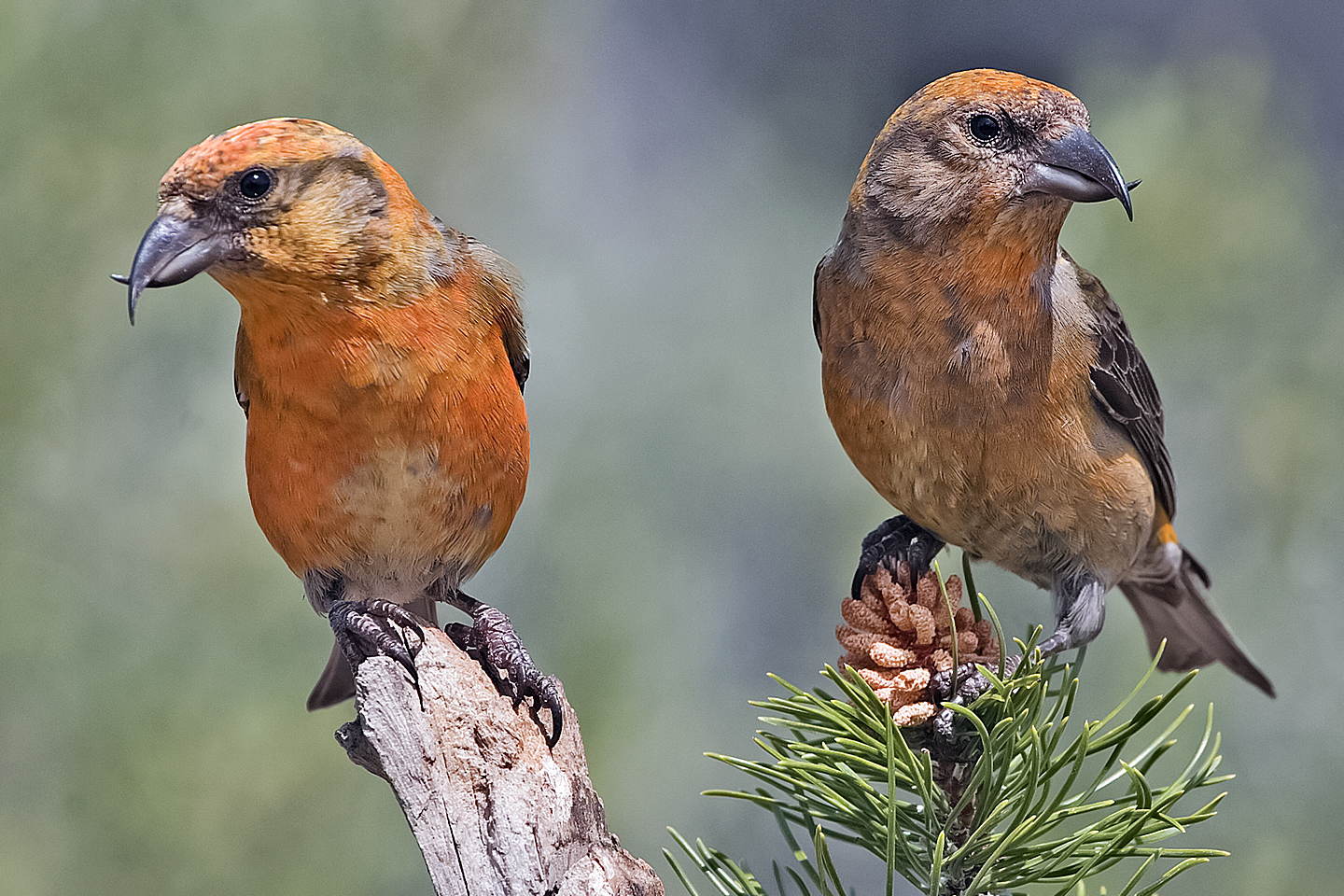
Red crossbills

Finches are seed-eating passerine birds, that are small to moderately large and have a strong beak, usually conical and in some species very large. All have twelve tail feathers and nine primaries. These birds have a bouncing flight with alternating bouts of flapping and gliding on closed wings, and most sing well.

- Elegant euphonia, Chlorophonia elegantissima (A)
- Scrub euphonia, Euphonia affinis
- White-vented euphonia, Euphonia minuta (A)
- Yellow-throated euphonia, Euphonia hirundinacea
- Olive-backed euphonia, Euphonia gouldi
- Red crossbill, Loxia curvirostra
- Black-headed siskin, Spinus notatus
- Lesser goldfinch, Spinus psaltria

== New World sparrows ==
Order: Passeriformes Family: Passerellidae

Until 2017, these species were considered part of the family Emberizidae. Most of the species are known as sparrows, but these birds are not closely related to the Old World sparrows which are in the family Passeridae. Many of these have distinctive head patterns.

- Common chlorospingus, Chlorospingus flavopectus
- Botteri's sparrow, Peucaea botterii
- Grasshopper sparrow, Ammodramus savannarum
- Olive sparrow, Arremonops rufivirgatus
- Green-backed sparrow, Arremonops chloronotus
- Lark sparrow, Chondestes grammacus (A)
- Chipping sparrow, Spizella passerina
- Clay-colored sparrow, Spizella pallida (A)
- Orange-billed sparrow, Arremon aurantiirostris
- White-crowned sparrow, Zonotrichia leucophrys (A)
- White-throated sparrow, Zonotrichia albicollis (A)
- Vesper sparrow, Pooecetes gramineus (A)
- Savannah sparrow, Passerculus sandwichensis
- Lincoln's sparrow, Melospiza lincolnii
- White-faced ground-sparrow, Melozone biarcuata (A)
- Rusty sparrow, Aimophila rufescens

== Yellow-breasted chat ==
Order: Passeriformes Family: Icteriidae

This species was historically placed in the wood-warblers (Parulidae) but nonetheless most authorities were unsure if it belonged there. It was placed in its own family in 2017.

- Yellow-breasted chat, Icteria virens

== Troupials and allies ==
Order: Passeriformes Family: Icteridae

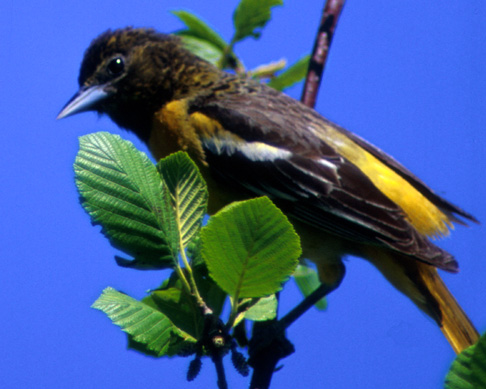
Baltimore oriole

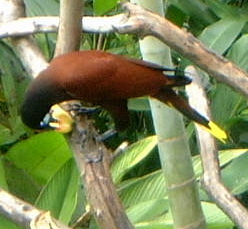
Montezuma oropendola

The icterids are a group of small to medium-sized, often colorful, passerine birds restricted to the New World and include the grackles, New World blackbirds, and New World orioles. Most species have black as the predominant plumage color, often enlivened by yellow, orange, or red.

- Yellow-headed blackbird, Xanthocephalus xanthocephalus (A)
- Bobolink, Dolichonyx oryzivorus
- Eastern meadowlark, Sturnella magna (near-threatened)
- Yellow-billed cacique, Amblycercus holosericeus
- Yellow-winged cacique, Cassiculus melanicterus (A)
- Chestnut-headed oropendola, Psarocolius wagleri
- Montezuma oropendola, Psarocolius montezuma
- Black-cowled oriole, Icterus prosthemelas
- Orchard oriole, Icterus spurius
- Hooded oriole, Icterus cucullatus
- Yellow-backed oriole, Icterus chrysater
- Yellow-tailed oriole, Icterus mesomelas
- Bullock's oriole, Icterus bullockii (A)
- Orange oriole, Icterus auratus
- Spot-breasted oriole, Icterus pectoralis
- Altamira oriole, Icterus gularis
- Baltimore oriole, Icterus galbula
- Red-winged blackbird, Agelaius phoeniceus
- Shiny cowbird, Molothrus bonariensis (A)
- Bronzed cowbird, Molothrus aeneus
- Brown-headed cowbird, Molothrus ater (A)
- Giant cowbird, Molothrus oryzivorus
- Melodious blackbird, Dives dives
- Great-tailed grackle, Quiscalus mexicanus

== New World warblers ==
Order: Passeriformes Family: Parulidae The wood-warblers are a group of small, often colorful, passerine birds restricted to the New World. Most are arboreal, but some are terrestrial. Most members of this family are insectivores.

- Ovenbird, Seiurus aurocapilla
- Worm-eating warbler, Helmitheros vermivorus
- Louisiana waterthrush, Parkesia motacilla
- Northern waterthrush, Parkesia noveboracensis
- Golden-winged warbler, Vermivora chrysoptera (near-threatened)
- Blue-winged warbler, Vermivora cyanoptera
- Black-and-white warbler, Mniotilta varia
- Prothonotary warbler, Protonotaria citrea
- Swainson's warbler, Limnothlypis swainsonii
- Tennessee warbler, Leiothlypis peregrina
- Orange-crowned warbler, Leiothlypis celata (A)
- Nashville warbler, Leiothlypis ruficapilla
- Virginia's warbler, Leiothlypis virginiae (A)
- Connecticut warbler, Oporornis agilis (A)
- Gray-crowned yellowthroat, Geothlypis poliocephala
- MacGillivray's warbler, Geothlypis tolmiei (A)
- Mourning warbler, Geothlypis philadelphia
- Kentucky warbler, Geothlypis formosa
- Common yellowthroat, Geothlypis trichas
- Hooded warbler, Setophaga citrina
- American redstart, Setophaga ruticilla
- Cape May warbler, Setophaga tigrina
- Cerulean warbler, Setophaga cerulea (vulnerable)
- Northern parula, Setophaga americana
- Tropical parula, Setophaga pitiayumi (A)
- Magnolia warbler, Setophaga magnolia
- Bay-breasted warbler, Setophaga castanea
- Blackburnian warbler, Setophaga fusca
- Yellow warbler, Setophaga petechia
- Chestnut-sided warbler, Setophaga pensylvanica
- Blackpoll warbler, Setophaga striata (near-threatened)
- Black-throated blue warbler, Setophaga caerulescens
- Palm warbler, Setophaga palmarum
- Yellow-rumped warbler, Setophaga coronata
- Yellow-throated warbler, Setophaga dominica
- Prairie warbler, Setophaga discolor
- Grace's warbler, Setophaga graciae
- Black-throated gray warbler, Setophaga nigrescens (A)
- Townsend's warbler, Setophaga townsendi (A)
- Hermit warbler, Setophaga occidentalis (A)
- Golden-cheeked warbler, Setophaga chrysoparia (A) (endangered)
- Black-throated green warbler, Setophaga virens
- Rufous-capped warbler, Basileuterus rufifrons
- Chestnut-capped warbler, Basileuterus delattrii
- Golden-crowned warbler, Basileuterus culicivorus
- Canada warbler, Cardellina canadensis
- Wilson's warbler, Cardellina pusilla
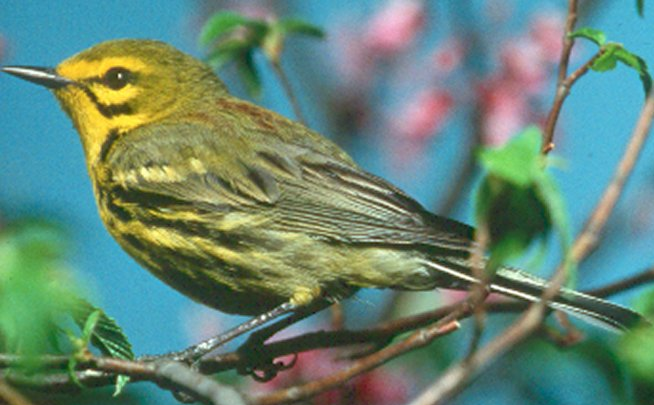
Prairie warbler

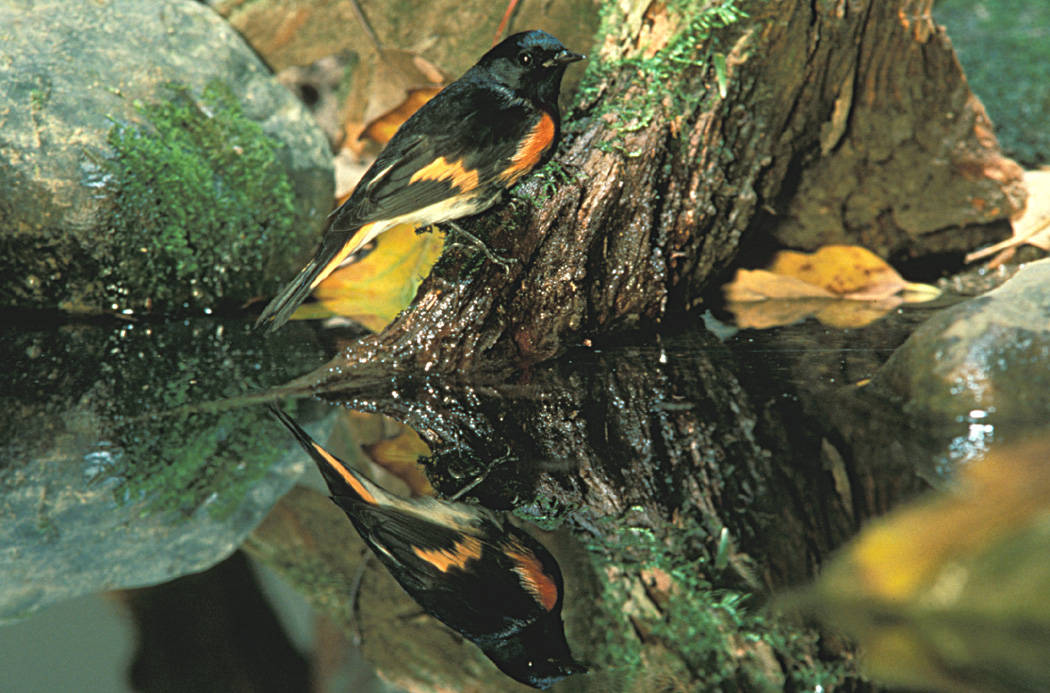
American redstart

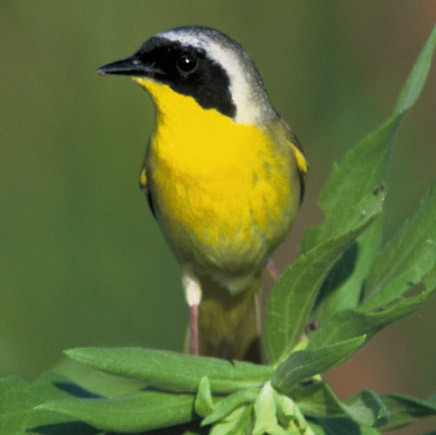
Common yellowthroat

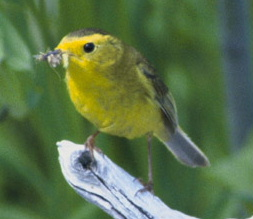
Wilson's warbler

== Cardinals and allies ==
Order: Passeriformes Family: Cardinalidae

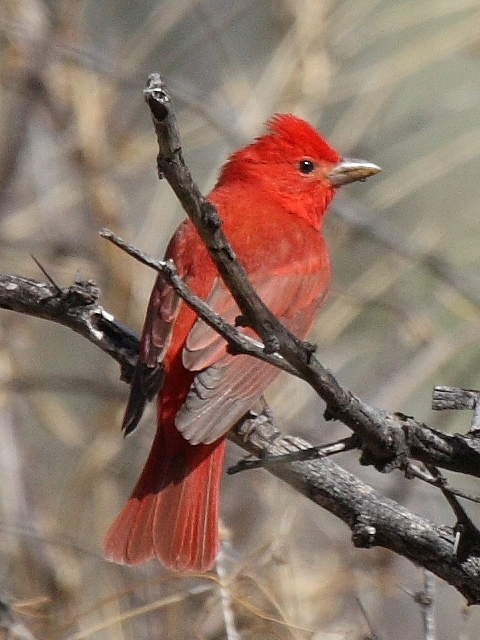
Summer tanager

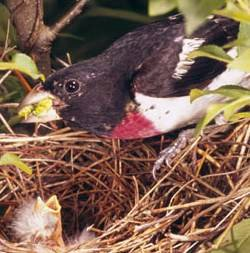
Rose-breasted grosbeak

The cardinals are a family of robust, seed-eating birds with strong bills. They are typically associated with open woodland. The sexes usually have distinct plumages.

- Rose-throated tanager, Piranga roseogularis
- Hepatic tanager, Piranga flava
- Summer tanager, Piranga rubra
- Scarlet tanager, Piranga olivacea
- Western tanager, Piranga ludoviciana
- Flame-colored tanager, Piranga bidentata (A)
- White-winged tanager, Piranga leucoptera
- Red-crowned ant-tanager, Habia rubica
- Red-throated ant-tanager, Habia fuscicauda
- Black-faced grosbeak, Caryothraustes poliogaster
- Northern cardinal, Cardinalis cardinalis
- Rose-breasted grosbeak, Pheucticus ludovicianus
- Black-headed grosbeak, Pheucticus melanocephalus (A)
- Gray-throated chat, Granatellus sallaei
- Blue seedeater, Amaurospiza concolor
- Blue-black grosbeak, Cyanoloxia cyanoides
- Blue bunting, Cyanocompsa parellina
- Blue grosbeak, Passerina caerulea
- Lazuli bunting, Passerina amoena (A)
- Indigo bunting, Passerina cyanea
- Painted bunting, Passerina ciris (near-threatened)
- Dickcissel, Spiza americana

== Tanagers and allies ==
Order: Passeriformes Family: Thraupidae

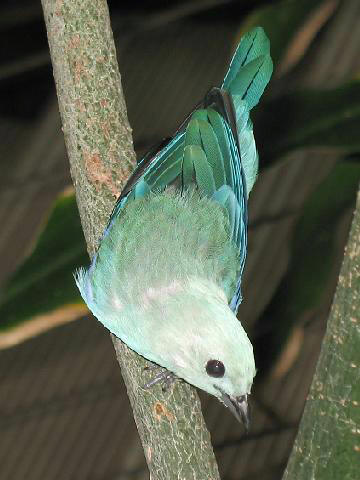
Blue-gray tanager

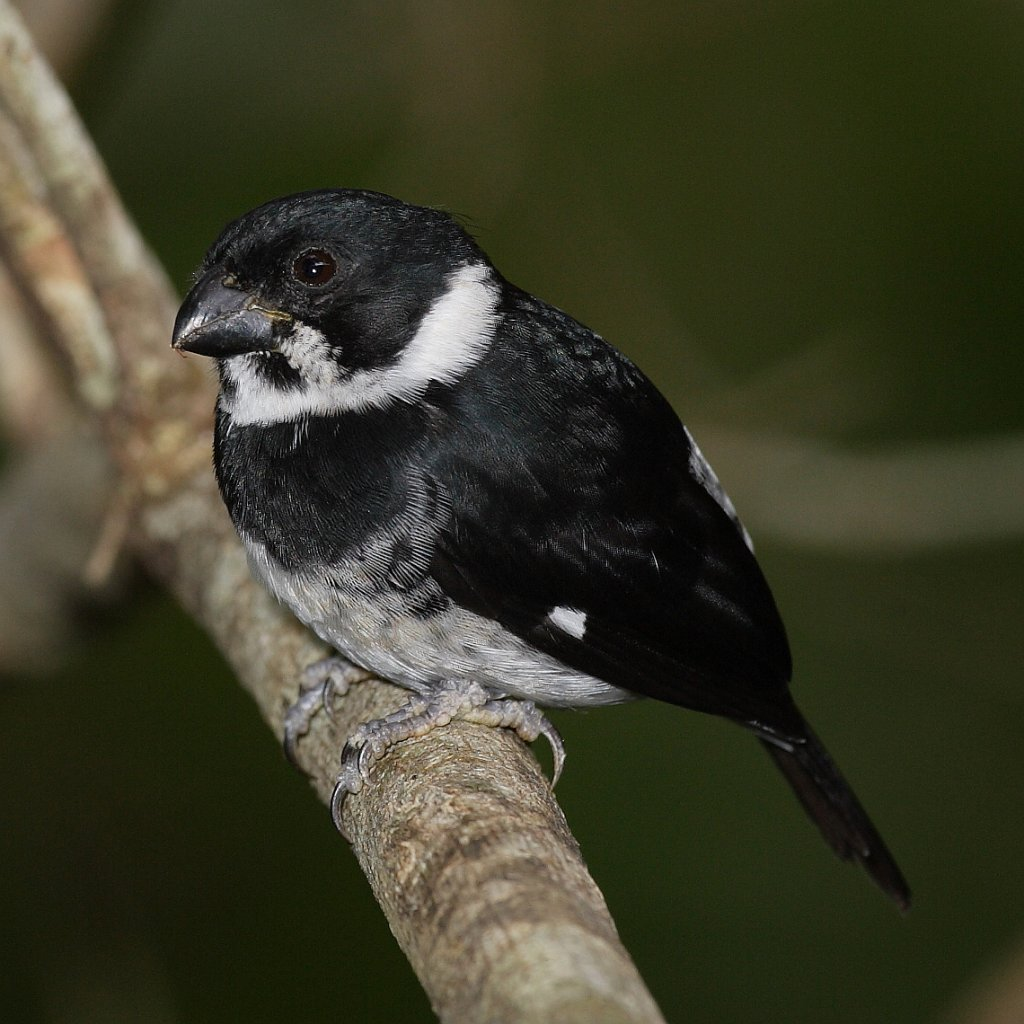
Variable seedeater

The tanagers are a large group of small to medium-sized passerine birds restricted to the New World, mainly in the tropics. Many species are brightly colored. As a family they are omnivorous, but individual species specialize in eating fruits, seeds, insects, or other types of food. Most have short, rounded wings.

- Golden-hooded tanager, Stilpnia larvata
- Blue-gray tanager, Thraupis episcopus
- Yellow-winged tanager, Thraupis abbas
- Grassland yellow-finch, Sicalis luteola
- Green honeycreeper, Chlorophanes spiza
- Blue-black grassquit, Volatinia jacarina
- Gray-headed tanager, Eucometis penicillata
- Black-throated shrike-tanager, Lanio aurantius
- Crimson-collared tanager, Ramphocelus sanguinolentus
- Scarlet-rumped tanager, Ramphocelus passerinii
- Shining honeycreeper, Cyanerpes lucidus
- Red-legged honeycreeper, Cyanerpes cyaneus
- Bananaquit, Coereba flaveola
- Yellow-faced grassquit, Tiaris olivaceus (A)
- Thick-billed seed-finch, Oryzoborus funereus
- Variable seedeater, Sporophila corvina
- Slate-colored seedeater, Sporophila schistacea
- Morelet's seedeater, Sporophila morelleti
- Black-headed saltator, Saltator atriceps
- Buff-throated saltator, Saltator maximus
- Olive-gray saltator, Saltator olivascens
- Cinnamon-bellied saltator, Saltator grandis

== See also ==
- Fauna of Belize
- List of birds
- Lists of birds by region
