= Melanocephalus =

Melanocephalus (fem.: melanocephala; n.: melanocephalum) is an epithet often used as the second word of a binomial name. It derives from Greek words meaning 'black-headed'. It is used in the names of the following species:

== Mammals ==
- Black-headed uakari, Cacajao melanocephalus

== Birds ==
- Arabian partridge, Alectoris melanocephala
- Black turnstone, Arenaria melanocephala
- Black-headed berryeater, Carpornis melanocephala
- Black-headed bunting, Emberiza melanocephala
- Black-headed grosbeak, Pheucticus melanocephalus
- Black-headed heron, Ardea melanocephala
- Black-headed ibis, Threskiornis melanocephalus
- Black-headed oriole, Icterus melanocephalus
- Black-headed parrot, Pionites melanocephala
- Black-headed trogon, Trogon melanocephalus
- Black-headed weaver, Ploceus melanocephalus
- Black-throated barbet, Tricholaema melanocephala
- Chatham Island bellbird, Anthornis melanocephala
- Mediterranean gull, Larus melanocephalus
- Noisy miner, Manorina melanocephala
- Red-backed fairywren, Malurus melanocephalus
- Sardinian warbler, Sylvia melanocephala
- Spectacled whitestart, Myioborus melanocephalus
- Spot-breasted plover, Vanellus melanocephalus
- Western tragopan, Tragopan melanocephalus

== Reptiles ==
- Black-headed python, Aspidites melanocephalus
- Rhynchocalamus melanocephalus
- Black-headed bushmaster, Lachesis melanocephala
- Black-headed dwarf chamaeleon, Bradypodion melanocephalum

== Fish ==
- Redtail filefish, Pervagor melanocephalus
- Largesnout goby, Awaous melanocephalus

== Insects ==
=== Beetles ===
- Calathus melanocephalus, a ground beetle
- Cercyon melanocephalus, a beetle
- Cyclocephala melanocephala, a beetle
- Dermestes melanocephalus, a beetle
- Dromius melanocephalus, a ground beetle
- Galeruca melanocephala, a leaf beetle
- Lasioderma melanocephalum, a beetle
- Paramecosoma melanocephalum, a beetle
- Parazuphium melanocephalum, a beetle

=== True bugs ===
- Arocatus melanocephalus, a lygaeid bug
- Cymus melanocephalus, a lygaeid bug

=== True files ===
- Wyeomyia melanocephala, a mosquito

=== Hymenopterans ===
- Neivamyrmex melanocephalus, an ant
- Odynerus melanocephalus, a potter wasp
- Tapinoma melanocephalum, an ant

=== Butterflies and moths ===
- Sesia melanocephala, a hornet moth

== Molluscs ==
- Krynickillus melanocephalus, a slug

== Crustaceans ==
- Ligia melanocephala, Ligidium melanocephalum or Zia melanocephala, all of which are synonyms of Ligidium hypnorum

== Vascular plants ==
- Blackhead fleabane, Erigeron melanocephalus
- the hawkweed Hieracium melanocephalum

== Fungi ==
- Puccinia melanocephala, a rust

== See also ==
- Animals named as black-legged
