= Blackguard =

"Blackguard" or "blaggard" is a term for a scoundrel. Blackguard or Black Guard(s) may refer to:

- Black Guard, a corps of Black African soldiers in Morocco
- Black Guard (Brazil), a militia of former slaves intended to protect the imperial monarchy
- Black Guard (Philippine Revolutionary Army), see Luna Sharpshooters
- Black Guards, armed anarchist groups formed after the 1917 Russian Revolution
- Blackguard (band), a death-metal band
- The Blackguard (novel), a 1923 novel by Raymond Paton
  - The Blackguard, 1925 film based on the novel
- Blackguards, a 2014 video-game from Daedalic Entertainment
- Black Band (landsknechts), also called Black Guards, mercenary army in Germany formed in 1514
- Blackguard (DC Comics), a character in the DC comics crime-group The 100
- Blackguard, a Fender Telecaster, Broadcaster, or Nocaster guitar made roughly between 1950 and 1954
- Blackguard, an anti-paladin character type in Dungeons & Dragons.

== See also ==
- Black Army
- Black Company
- Black Hundreds
- Black Watch (disambiguation)
