= Cymodema breviceps =

Scientific classification
- Domain: Eukaryota
- Kingdom: Animalia
- Phylum: Arthropoda
- Class: Insecta
- Order: Hemiptera
- Suborder: Heteroptera
- Family: Cymidae
- Genus: Cymodema
- Species: C. breviceps

Binomial name
- Cymodema breviceps (Stal, 1874)

Species of true bug

Cymodema breviceps is a species of true bug in the family Cymidae. It is found in the Caribbean Sea, Central America, North America, and South America.
