= Black Legend (disambiguation) =

A black legend is a style of constructed historical narrative that demonizes a specific nation or person, particularly the purported Spanish Black Legend..

Black Legend may also refer to:

- Black Legend of the Spanish Inquisition
- Black Legend (music group), a UK group of musicians
- Black Legend (company), a defunct video game publisher

== See also ==
- Black (disambiguation)
- Black Hand (disambiguation)
- Black leg (disambiguation)
- Legend (disambiguation)
- White legend, Spanish historiographic approach to counter the alleged effects of the Black legend
