= Blue Army =

Blue Army may refer to:

- Blue Army (Poland), the Polish army unit
- Blue Army (Russia), a term for some armed peasant groups in the Tambov Rebellion during the Russian Civil War, more typically considered part of the 'green armies'
- Blue Army of Our Lady of Fátima, the Catholic lay organization
- Blue Army (Aerosmith), Aerosmith fans
- Ipswich Town F.C., nickname for Ipswich Town football club fans
- Leicester City F.C., nickname for the football club
- Portsmouth F.C. chant used in games

== See also ==
- Black Army (disambiguation)
