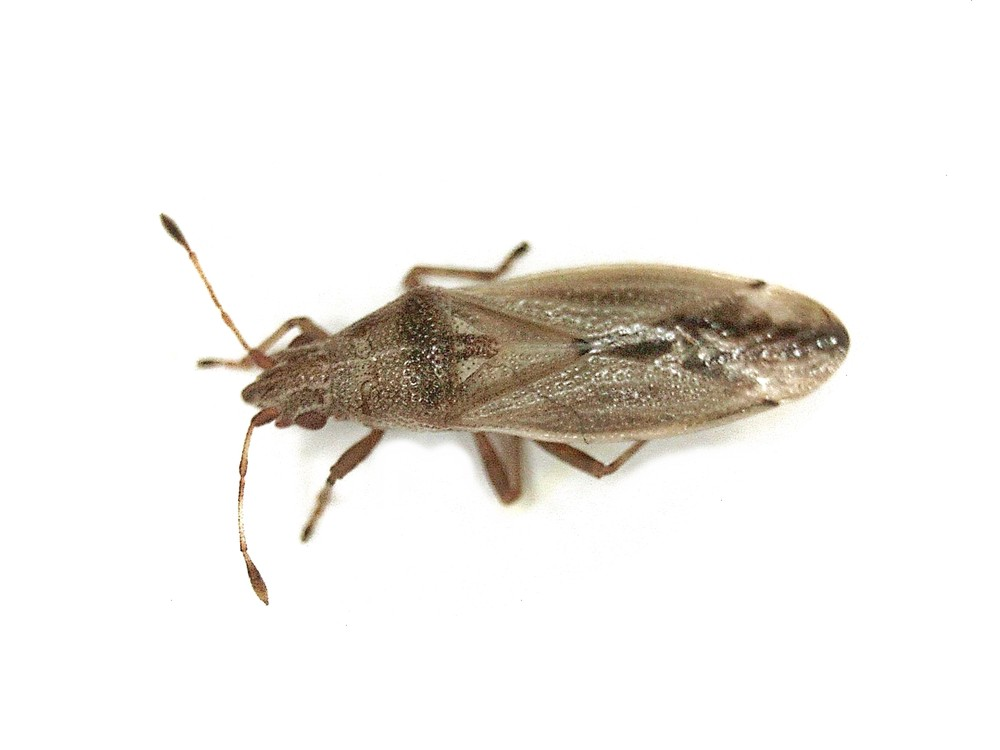

Scientific classification
- Domain: Eukaryota
- Kingdom: Animalia
- Phylum: Arthropoda
- Class: Insecta
- Order: Hemiptera
- Suborder: Heteroptera
- Family: Cymidae
- Genus: Cymus
- Species: C. angustatus

Binomial name
- Cymus angustatus Stal, 1874

= Cymus angustatus =

Species of true bug

Cymus angustatus is a species of true bug in the family Cymidae. It is found in Central America and North America.
