= Cymus luridus =

Scientific classification
- Domain: Eukaryota
- Kingdom: Animalia
- Phylum: Arthropoda
- Class: Insecta
- Order: Hemiptera
- Suborder: Heteroptera
- Family: Cymidae
- Genus: Cymus
- Species: C. luridus

Binomial name
- Cymus luridus Stal, 1874

Species of bug

Cymus luridus is a species of true bug in the family Cymidae. It is found in Central America and North America.
