= Cymus robustus =

Scientific classification
- Domain: Eukaryota
- Kingdom: Animalia
- Phylum: Arthropoda
- Class: Insecta
- Order: Hemiptera
- Suborder: Heteroptera
- Family: Cymidae
- Genus: Cymus
- Species: C. robustus

Binomial name
- Cymus robustus Barber, 1924

Species of true bug

Cymus robustus is a species of true bug in the family Cymidae. It is found in North America.
