= Cymus elegans =

Scientific classification
- Kingdom: Animalia
- Phylum: Arthropoda
- Clade: Pancrustacea
- Class: Insecta
- Order: Hemiptera
- Suborder: Heteroptera
- Family: Cymidae
- Genus: Cymus
- Species: C. elegans

Binomial name
- Cymus elegans (Josifov & Kerzhner, 1978)

Species of true bug

Cymus elegans is a species of bugs in the family Lygaeidae. It is found in Korea.
