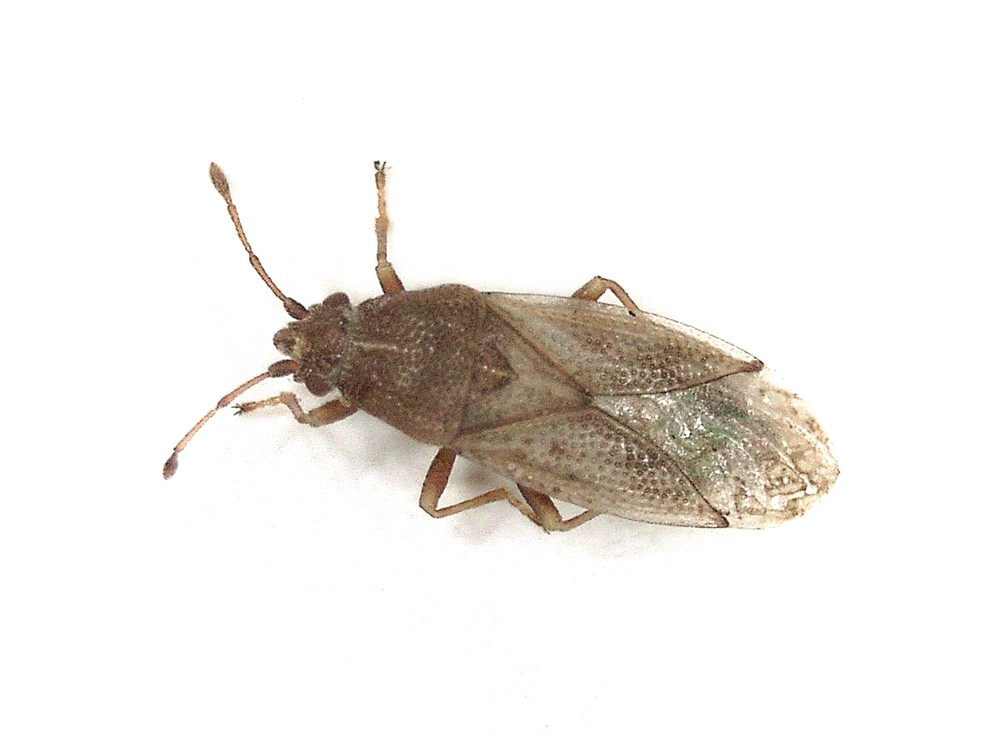

Scientific classification
- Domain: Eukaryota
- Kingdom: Animalia
- Phylum: Arthropoda
- Class: Insecta
- Order: Hemiptera
- Suborder: Heteroptera
- Family: Cymidae
- Genus: Cymus
- Species: C. discors

Binomial name
- Cymus discors Horvath, 1908

= Cymus discors =

Species of true bug

Cymus discors is a species of true bug in the family Cymidae. It is found in North America.
