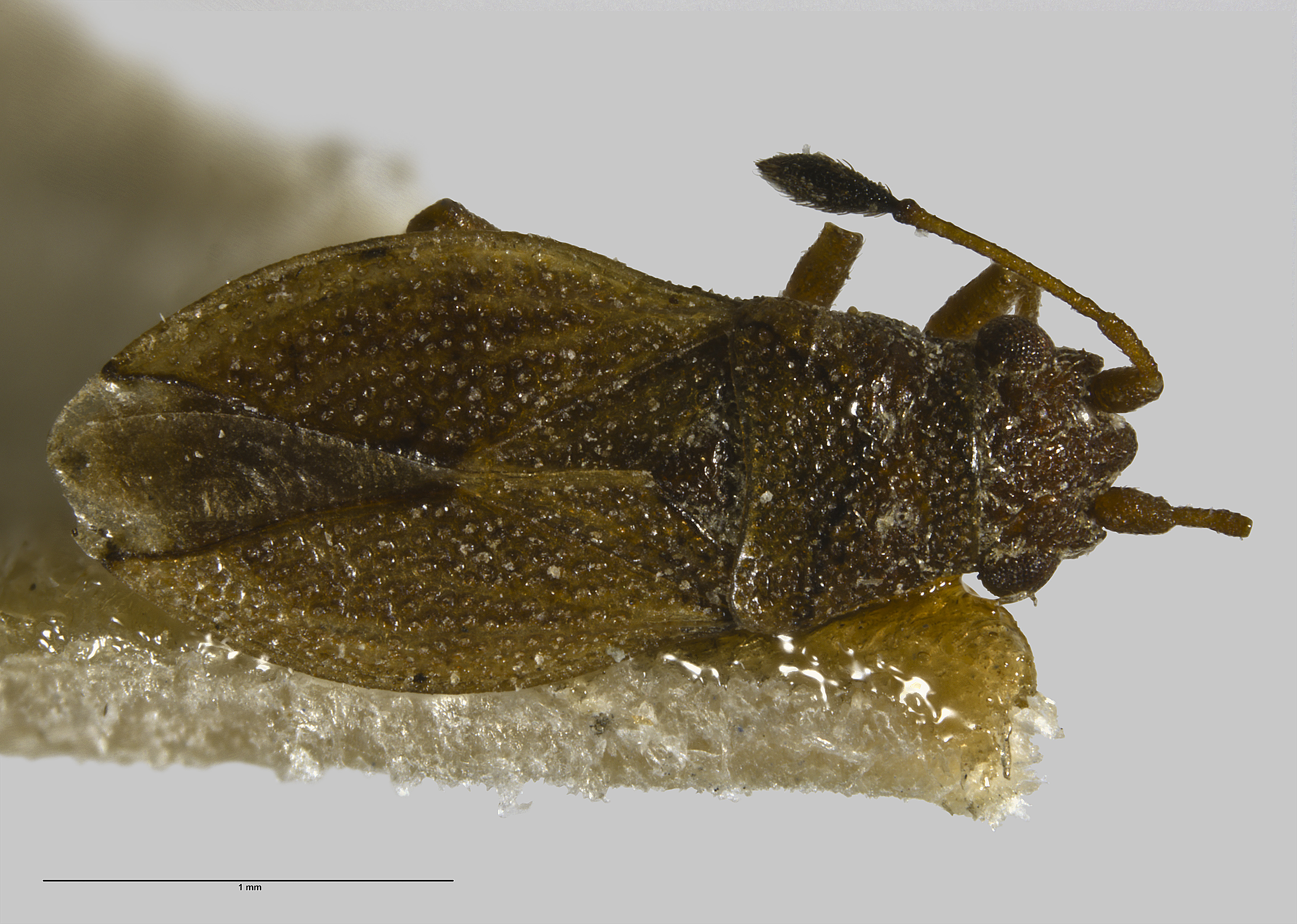
- Dorsal view of male holotype specimen of Cymus novaezelandiae AMNZ21726 held at the Auckland War Memorial Museum.

Scientific classification
- Kingdom: Animalia
- Phylum: Arthropoda
- Class: Insecta
- Order: Hemiptera
- Suborder: Heteroptera
- Family: Cymidae
- Genus: Cymus; Hahn, 1832

Synonyms
- Arphnus Stål, 1874

= Cymus =

Genus of true bugs

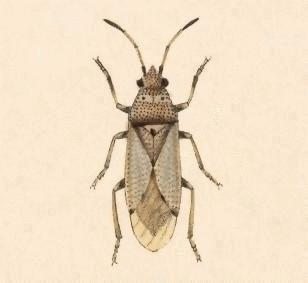
Cymus guatemalanus

Cymus is a genus of true bugs in the family Cymidae. There are at least 40 described species in Cymus.

== Species ==
These 41 species belong to the genus Cymus:

- Cymus africanus Hamid, A., 1975^{c g}
- Cymus angustatus Stal, 1874^{i c g b}
- Cymus aurescens Distant, W.L., 1883^{c g}
- Cymus bellus Van Duzee, 1909^{i c g}
- Cymus braziliensis Hamid, A., 1975^{c g}
- Cymus californicus Hamid, 1975^{i c g}
- Cymus capeneri Hamid, A., 1975^{c g}
- Cymus ceylonensis Hamid, A., 1975^{c g}
- Cymus chinensis Hamid, A., 1975^{c g}
- Cymus claviculus (Fallén, 1807)^{i c g}
- Cymus coriacipennis (Stål, 1859)^{i c g}
- Cymus dipus Germar, E.F., 1837^{c g}
- Cymus discors Horvath, 1908^{i c g b}
- Cymus drakei Slater, J.A., 1964^{c g}
- Cymus elegans Josifov, M. & I.M. Kerzhner, 1978^{c g}
- Cymus ferrugineus Linnavuori, R., 1978^{c g}
- Cymus foliaceus Motschulsky, V., 1859^{c g}
- Cymus glandicolor Hahn, 1831^{c g}
- Cymus gracilicornis Vidal, J.P., 1940^{c g}
- Cymus guatemalanus Distant, 1893^{i c g}
- Cymus koreanus Josifov, M. & I.M. Kerzhner, 1978^{c g}
- Cymus luridus Stal, 1874^{i c g b}
- Cymus marginatus Puton, A., 1895^{c g}
- Cymus melanocephalus Fieber, F.X., 1861^{c g}
- Cymus melanotylus (Ashlock, P.D., 1961)^{c g}
- Cymus mexicanus Distant, W.L., 1882^{c g}
- Cymus minutus Lindberg, H., 1939^{c g}
- Cymus nigrofemoralis Hamid, 1975^{i c g}
- Cymus nocturnus Bergroth, E. & H. Schouteden, 1905^{c g}
- Cymus novaezelandiae Woodward, T.E., 1954^{c g}
- Cymus remanei Heiss & Pericart, 1999^{g}
- Cymus robustus Barber, 1924^{i c g b}
- Cymus rufescens Hamid, A., 1975^{c g}
- Cymus ruficornis Hamid, A., 1975^{c g}
- Cymus simplex Horvath, G., 1882^{c g}
- Cymus sp nocturnus^{g}
- Cymus syrianensis Hamid, A., 1975^{c g}
- Cymus tabaci Matsumura, S., 1910^{c g}
- Cymus tripunctatus (Van Duzee, E.P., 1933)^{c g}
- Cymus tumescens Zheng, 1981^{c g}
- Cymus waelbroecki Bergroth, E., 1905^{c g}

Data sources: i = ITIS, c = Catalogue of Life, g = GBIF, b = Bugguide.net
