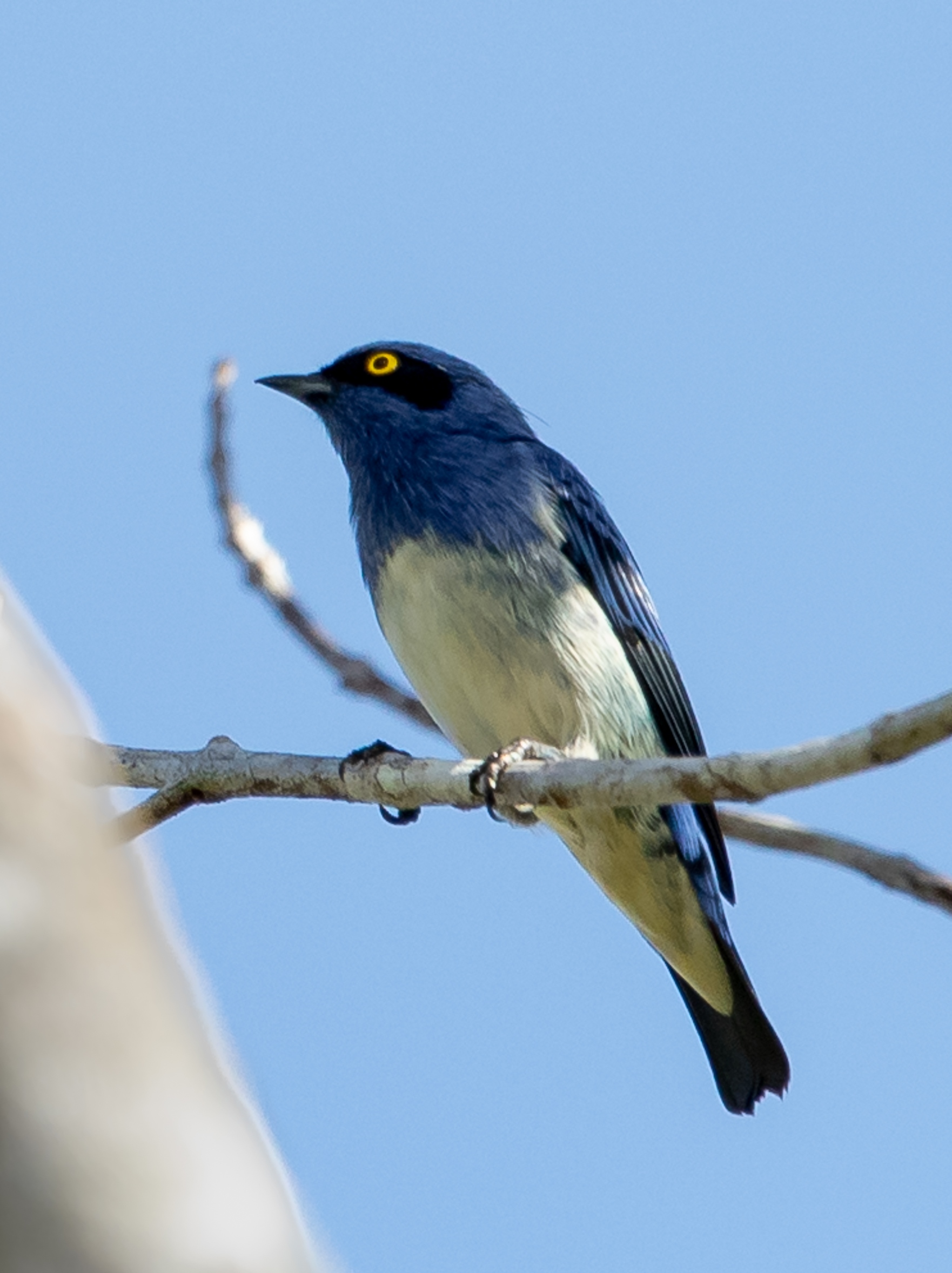

Conservation status
- Least Concern (IUCN 3.1)

Scientific classification
- Kingdom: Animalia
- Phylum: Chordata
- Class: Aves
- Order: Passeriformes
- Family: Thraupidae
- Genus: Dacnis
- Species: D. albiventris

Binomial name
- Dacnis albiventris (Sclater, PL, 1852)

= White-bellied dacnis =

Species of bird

The white-bellied dacnis (Dacnis albiventris) is a species of bird in the family Thraupidae, the tanagers and allies. It is found in Brazil, Colombia, Ecuador, Peru, and Venezuela.

== Taxonomy and systematics ==
The white-bellied dacnis was formally described in 1852 with the binomial Pipraeidea albiventris. For a time it was assigned its own genus Hemidacnis but has been assigned to Dacnis since the middle of the twentieth century. The species is monotypic.

== Description ==
The white-bellied dacnis is 10 cm (3.9 in) to 12 cm (4.7 in) long. It weighs 11 to 11.5 g (0.39 to 0.41 oz). It has a short, conical, pointed bill. The species is sexually dimorphic. Adult males have a bright cobalt-blue head with a triangular black mask from the lores through the eye onto the ear coverts. Their upperparts are mostly cobalt-blue withe black scapulars. Their wing's lesser coverts are cobalt-blue and the median and greater coverts black with wide cobalt-blue edges. Their flight feathers are black with cobalt-blue edges. Their tail is black. Their throat and breast are cobalt-blue, their belly to undertail coverts white, and their flanks light gray with light blue spotting. Adult females have a dull olive head with darker lores. Their back is dull olive that becomes greener on the rump. Their wing coverts are olive brown and the flight feathers olive with olive-brown edges. Their tail is dusky. Their throat is grayish white and their underparts mostly greenish yellow with a yellower center to the belly. Both sexes have a blackish bill and gray legs and feet. Males have a golden yellow iris and females' are light brown to grayish brown.

== Distribution and habitat ==
The white-bellied dacnis is primarily a bird of the far western Amazon Basin. It is found across the southeastern third of Colombia south intermittently through eastern Ecuador into northeastern Peru as far as central Ucayali Department with a few reports further south. From Colombia and Peru its range extends northeast across far western Brazil's Acre, Amazonas, and Roraima states into southwestern Amazonas state in southern Venezuela. There are also a few records in central and eastern Amazonian Brazil.

The white-bellied dacnis "appears to prefer somewhat marginal habitats". These include white-sand forest and savanna, well-weathered terra firme, and campina. In elevation it reaches 500 m (1,600 ft) in Colombia, 300 m (1,000 ft) in Ecuador, 200 m (700 ft) in Venezuela, and 400 m (1,300 ft) in Brazil.

== Behavior ==
=== Movement ===
The white-bellied dacnis is generally a year-round resident. However, it is suspected of making some seasonal movements in Colombia.

=== Feeding ===
The white-bellied dacnis feeds on berries, insects, and nectar. It usually forages singly or in pairs, though sometimes in small groups, and most of the time with mixed-species feeding flocks. It forages mostly in the forest canopy though lower at the edges. It gleans insects from foliage, often hanging upside down, and also takes them in mid-air.

=== Breeding ===
Nothing is known about the white-bellied dacnis' breeding biology.

=== Vocalization ===
The white-bellied dacnis' song is "a high and lisping see-suleleee, interspersed with call notes and trills such as tzet tzaleet saleet't't't't't with phrases separated by short intervals of 1 to 3 seconds". Its calls include "a high, descending tseew and rising tee?, also a thin ti often given in series".

== Status ==
The IUCN originally in 1988 assessed the white-bellied dacnis as Threatened, then in 1994 as Near Threatened, and since 2000 as being of Least Concern. It has a large range; its population size is not known but is believed to be stable. No immediate threats have been identified. It is considered "uncommon and seemingly seasonal" in Colombia, "rare and very local" in Ecuador, "rare [and] poorly known" in Peru, "rare" with only "scattered records" in Venezuela, and "uncommon to rare" in Brazil. It has "a high degree of sensitivity to human disturbance relative to other Neotropical birds" but does occur in several protected areas.
