= Black Legion =

Black Legion may refer to:

- Black Legion (film), a 1937 American crime drama
- Black Legion (political movement), a 1930s Ku Klux Klan splinter group in the United States
- Black Legion (Ustaše militia), a 1941 Croatian military unit active during World War II in Yugoslavia
- Black Army of Hungary, an army of the Kingdom of Hungary in the 15th century
- Black Brunswickers, an army raised in 1809 by Frederick William, Duke of Brunswick and Lüneburg against Napoleon I
- Légion Noire, an army of French criminals raised for the last invasion of Britain in 1797
- Les Légions Noires, a 1987 French Black Metal movement
- The paramilitary unit of the 1968-formed Republic of New Afrika
- The Black Legion, an antagonistic faction of Chaos Space Marines in the fictional Warhammer 40,000 setting.

== See also ==
- Black Army (disambiguation)
- Legion (disambiguation)
- Blackleg (disambiguation)
