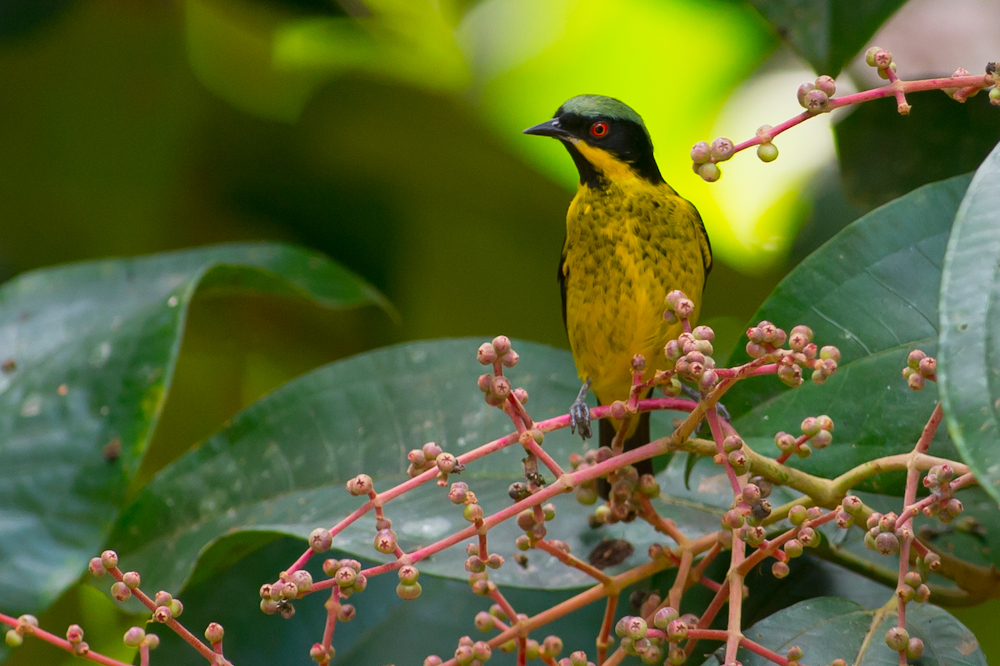
- Male, Peru
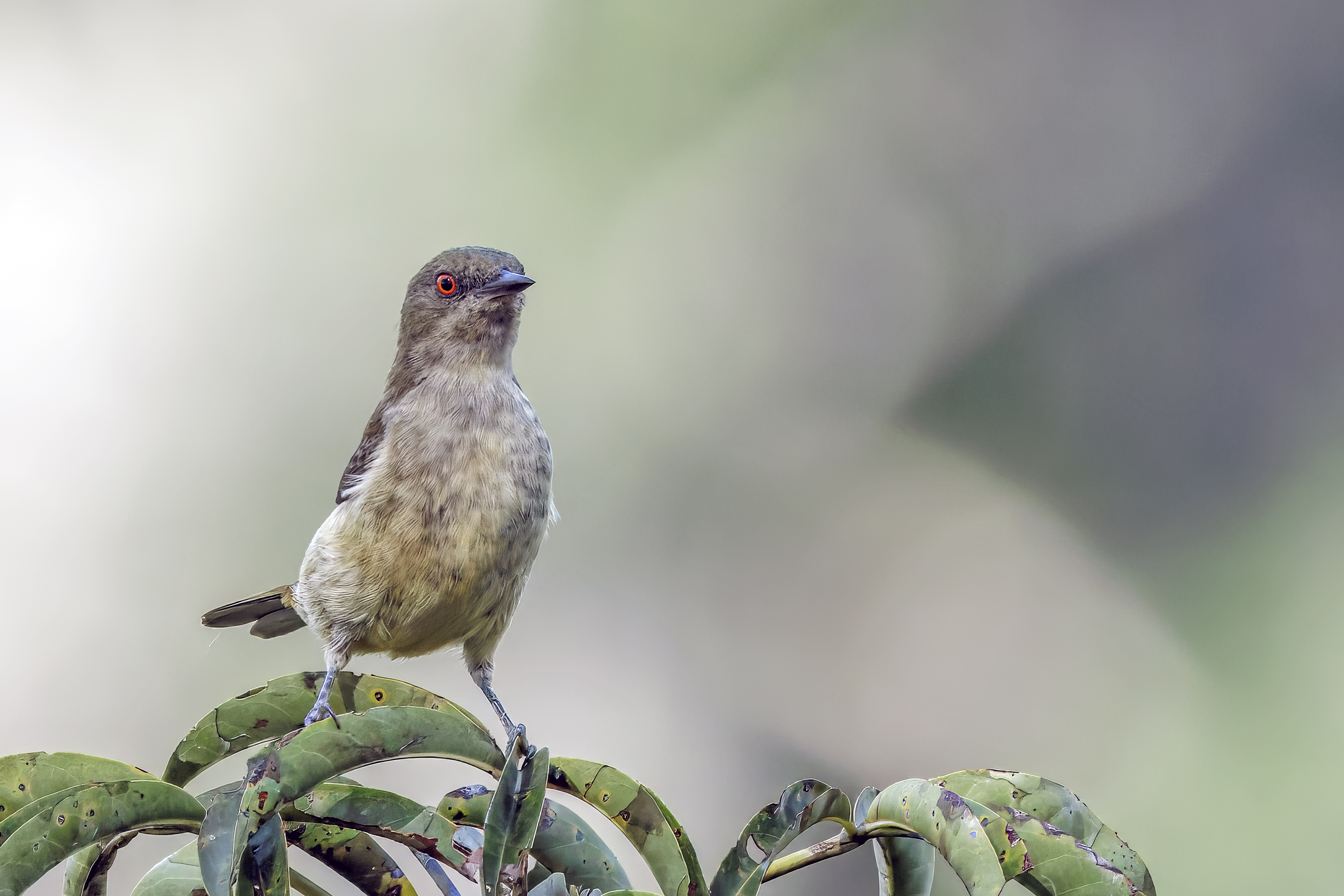
- Female, Ecuador

Conservation status
- Least Concern (IUCN 3.1)

Scientific classification
- Kingdom: Animalia
- Phylum: Chordata
- Class: Aves
- Order: Passeriformes
- Family: Thraupidae
- Genus: Dacnis
- Species: D. flaviventer

Binomial name
- Dacnis flaviventer d'Orbigny & Lafresnaye, 1837

= Yellow-bellied dacnis =

Species of bird

The yellow-bellied dacnis (Dacnis flaviventer) is a species of bird in the family Thraupidae, the tanagers and allies. It is found in Bolivia, Brazil, Colombia, Ecuador, Peru, and Venezuela.

== Taxonomy and systematics ==
The yellow-bellied dacnis was formally described in 1837 with its current binomial Dacnis flaviventer. The species is monotypic.

== Description ==
The yellow-bellied dacnis is 11 to 13 cm (4.3 to 5.1 in) long; three individuals weighed 12 to 14 g (0.42 to 0.49 oz). It has a short, slightly decurved, pointed bill. The species is sexually dimorphic. Adult males have a dark mossy green crown to the upper nape and a wide yellow malar stripe on an otherwise black face. Their lower nape and mantle are black. Their scapulars, the sides of their back, and their rump and uppertail coverts are yellow. Their tail, upperwing coverts, and flight feathers are black. They have a teardrop-shaped black throat. Their underparts are yellow with black streaks that weaken from the breast to the belly. Adult females have an olive-green head and upperparts and dusky brown wings and tail. Their breast is dingy yellowish buff that becomes yellower on the belly; they have olive streaks like the male's black ones. Both sexes have a yellowish red to bright red iris, a black bill, and gray legs and feet.

== Distribution and habitat ==
The yellow-bellied dacnis is primarily a bird of the western and central Amazon Basin. The northernmost part of its range is in Venezuela from southwestern Bolívar state south through most of Amazonas state. From there its range continues south through the southeastern third of Colombia, eastern Ecuador, and eastern Peru into northwestern Bolivia. Its range extends east into Brazil from these western limits. There it is found north of the Amazon River east to the Branco River and south of the Amazon to central Pará with a southern border from northwestern Mato Grosso west to eastern Rondônia and Acre states. There are also scattered records near the mouth of the Amazon in Pará.

The yellow-bellied dacnis primarily inhabits evergreen forest including terra firme, várzea, and igapó; there it is often found around lakes and along watercourses. It also occurs in savanna woodlands and the ecotone between wet landscapes and drier ones. It is found up to about 350 m (1,100 ft) in Venezuela, to 500 m (1,600 ft) in Colombia, Ecuador, and Brazil, and to 600 m (2,000 ft) and locally to 1,000 m (3,300 ft) in Peru.

== Behavior ==
=== Movement ===
The yellow-bellied dacnis is primarily a year-round resident though some elevational movements are suspected.

=== Feeding ===
The yellow-bellied dacnis feeds on fruits, insects, and nectar. It forages actively from the forest's mid-level to its canopy, taking its food from living foliage. If forages mostly in pairs, sometimes in small groups, and only infrequently joins mixed-species feeding flocks.

=== Breeding ===
The yellow-bellied dacnis apparently breeds during the local dry season that includes June in Colombia and December in Ecuador. Its first nest was described in 2006. It was a cup made from plant material including ferns bound with spider web and hidden within a clump of mistletoe (Loranthaceae). It was near the top of a tree about 6.5 m (20 ft) above the ground. When discovered it held two nestlings that were being fed by both parents. Nothing else is known about the species' breeding biology.

=== Vocalization ===
The yellow-bellied dacnis' song is "seldom heard (or perhaps seldom noticed)...a sharp and fairly high-pitched whuh-zeeé". Its calls include "a high-pitched and short zeet, or seep and a buzzy, lower ascending zrreet or tcheew".

== Status ==
The IUCN has assessed the yellow-bellied dacnis as being of Least Concern. It has a very large range; its population size is not known and is believed to be decreasing. No immediate threats have been identified. It is uncommon and known from only a few records in Venezuela. It is common in Colombia and Ecuador, "uncommon to fairly common but widespread" in Peru, and "frequent to uncommon" in Brazil. It occurs in many protected areas.
