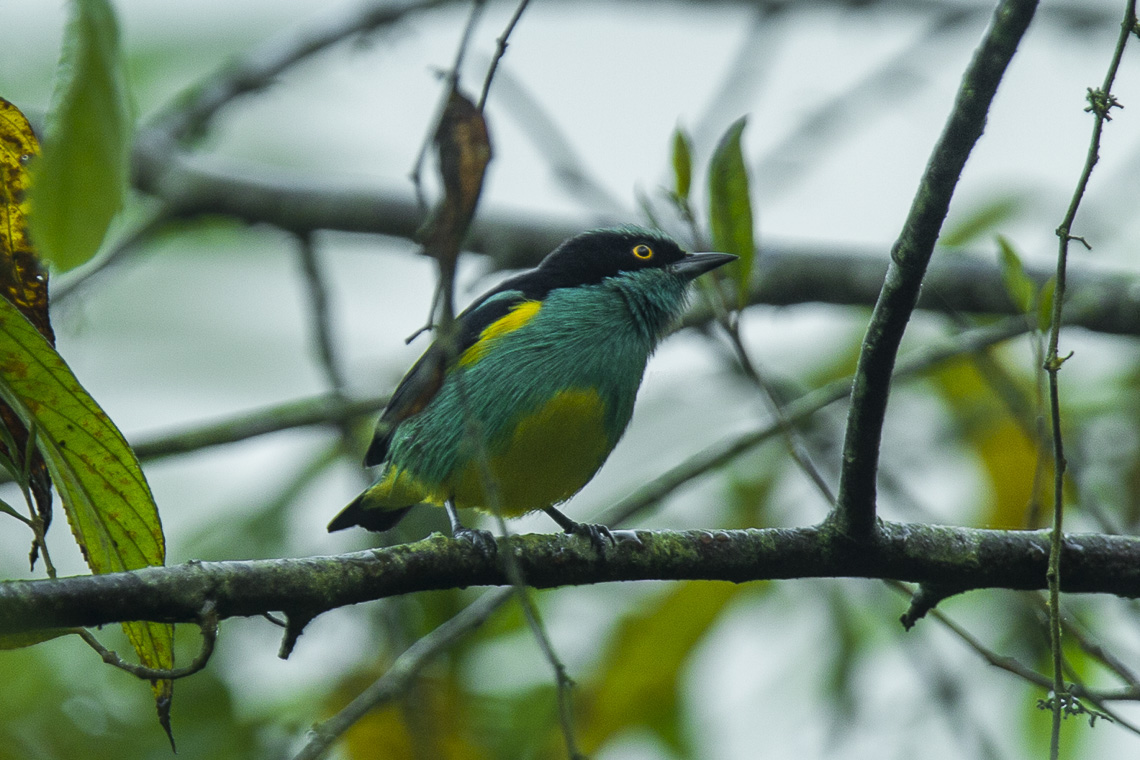

Conservation status
- Least Concern (IUCN 3.1)

Scientific classification
- Kingdom: Animalia
- Phylum: Chordata
- Class: Aves
- Order: Passeriformes
- Family: Thraupidae
- Genus: Dacnis
- Species: D. egregia

Binomial name
- Dacnis egregia Sclater, PL, 1855

= Yellow-tufted dacnis =

Species of bird

The yellow-tufted dacnis (Dacnis egregia) is a species of bird in the family Thraupidae, the tanagers and allies. It is found in Colombia and Ecuador.

== Taxonomy and systematics ==
The yellow-tufted dacnis was formally described in 1855 with its current binomial Dacnis egregia.

The species' further taxonomy is unsettled. The South American Classification Committee (SACC), the IOC, the Clements taxonomy, and BirdLife International's Handbook of the Birds of the World (HBW) treat the yellow-tufted dacnis as a full species. They had previously treated its two subspecies as belonging to the black-faced dacnis (D. lineata).

However, in its initial 2025 version, AviList declined to split the yellow-tufted dacnis from the black-faced. In light of the decisions by the SACC, IOC, Clements, and HBW to split them, AviList is considering adopting the split in its 2026 version.

This article follows the full species model. The yellow-tufted dacnis' two subspecies are the nominate D. e. egregia (Sclater, PL, 1855) and D. e. aequatorialis (Berlepsch & Taczanowski, 1884).

== Description ==
The yellow-tufted dacnis is 10 to 11.5 cm (3.9 to 4.5 in) long. It has a thin, sharply pointed bill. The species is sexually dimorphic. Adult males of the nominate subspecies have a turquoise green crown and a wide black mask from just above the bill to past the eye; the color continues around the hindcrown and nape. Their mantle, upper edge of the scapulars, and back are black. The lower edge of the scapulars, rump, and uppertail coverts are turquoise green. Their wings and tail are black with turquoise green edges on the tertials and innermost secondaries. Their throat, breast, and flanks are mostly turquoise green with the eponymous bright yellow pectoral tuft. Their belly, undertail coverts, and underwing coverts are also bright yellow. Adult females have a grayish olive head and upperparts. Their wings and tail are darker olive. Their throat is pale grayish, their upper breast and flanks yellowish olive, and their lower breast, belly, and undertail coverts dull yellow. Like the male they have a bright yellow pectoral tuft. Males of subspecies D. e. aequatorialis are somewhat greener and females have a more grayish head than the nominate. Both sexes of both subspecies have a yellow iris, a black bill with a gray base to the mandible, and blackish legs and feet.

== Distribution and habitat ==
The yellow-tufted dacnis has a disjunct distribution; the two subspecies are separate. The nominate is the more northerly. It is found in Colombia's Central Andes from southern Córdoba Department south to Huila Department. Subspecies D. e. aequatorialis is found from Nariño Department in extreme southwestern Colombia south through western Ecuador to northern El Oro Province. The species inhabits a variety of somewhat open landscapes including the edges and clearings of extensive forest, secondary woodlands, plantations, and gardens with trees. In elevation it reaches 1,200 m (3,900 ft) in Colombia and 900 m (3,000 ft) in Ecuador.

== Behavior ==
=== Movement ===
The yellow-tufted dacnis is believed to be a year-round resident.

=== Feeding ===
The yellow-tufted dacnis feeds primarily on arthropods and small fruits. It forages mostly singly and in pairs and sometimes in family groups, and it regularly joins mixed-species feeding flocks. It forages mostly in the forest canopy, actively seeking food in vegetation and sometimes hanging upside down to reach it. It also gleans prey from leaves while briefly hovering after a short sally from a perch.

=== Breeding ===
The yellow-tufted dacnis' breeding season has not been defined, but evidence suggests that it includes May to September and December. Nothing else is known about the species' breeding biology.

=== Vocalization ===
The yellow-tufted dacnis' song has seldom been recorded and has not been described. Its most commonly heard call is "a short (ca. 0.15 s), high-pitched, finely modulated Tsrrip note". It also makes a "very high-pitched...downslurred Tsip note".

== Status ==
The IUCN has assessed the yellow-tufted dacnis as being of Least Concern. It has a large range; its population size is not known and is believed to be decreasing. No immediate threats have been identified. It is considered "fairly common" in Colombia and "widespread" in Ecuador. It occurs in a few protected areas.
