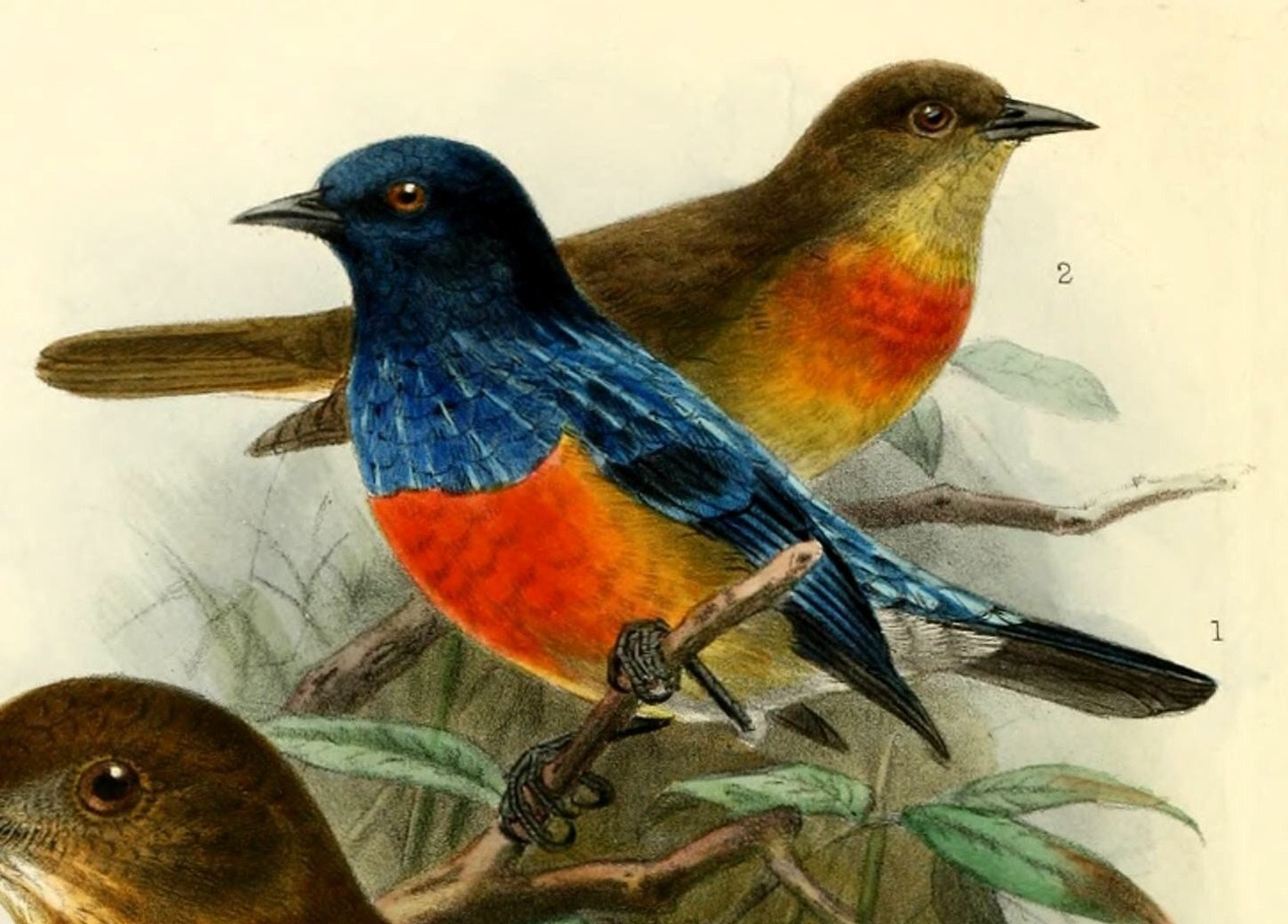

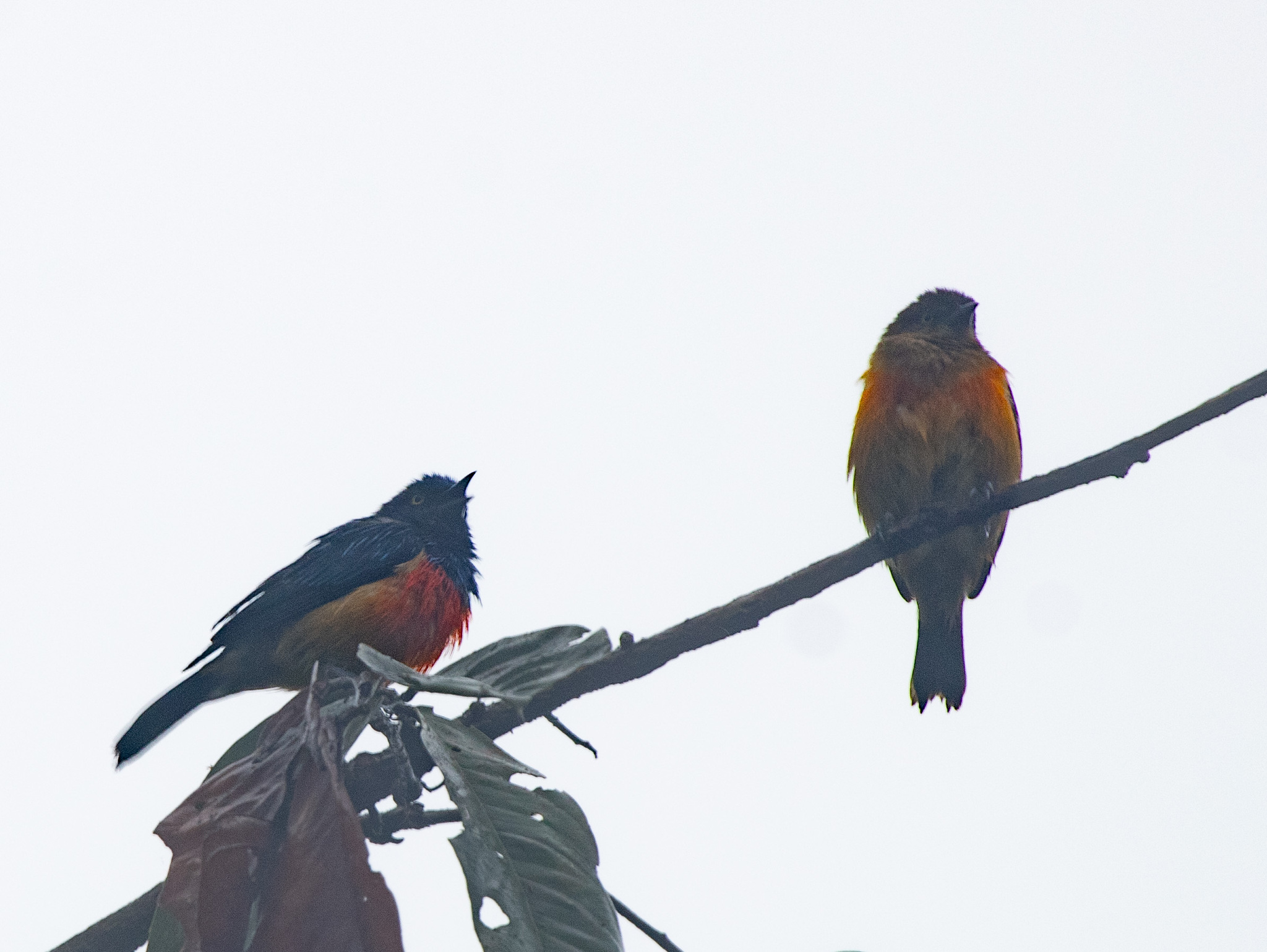

Conservation status
- Least Concern (IUCN 3.1)

Scientific classification
- Kingdom: Animalia
- Phylum: Chordata
- Class: Aves
- Order: Passeriformes
- Family: Thraupidae
- Genus: Dacnis
- Species: D. berlepschi

Binomial name
- Dacnis berlepschi Hartert, EJO, 1900

= Scarlet-breasted dacnis =

Species of bird

The scarlet-breasted dacnis (Dacnis berlepschi) is a species of bird in the family Thraupidae, the tanagers and allies. It is found in Colombia and Ecuador.

== Taxonomy and systematics ==
The scarlet-breasted dacnis was formally described in 1900 with its current binomial Dacnis berlepschi. It is monotypic.

== Description ==
The scarlet-breasted dacnis is 12 cm (4.7 in) long. It has a thin pointed bill. The species is sexually dimorphic. Adult males have a mostly hyacinth-blue head with a small black mask from the lores to just past the eye. Their mantle, back, and scapulars are also hyacinth-blue but with silvery blue streaks along the feather shafts. Their rump is lighter blue and unstreaked. Their tail is mostly black with thin pale blue feather edges. Their flight feathers are mostly black with inconspicuous dull blue edges. Their chin, throat, and upper breast are hyacinth-blue. Their mid-breast has a wide bright red band that fades to yellow on the lower breast and to whitish buff on the belly and undertail coverts. Their thighs are blackish. Adult females have a brown to dark sepia-brown head and upperparts with a somewhat brighter rump. Their tail is dark brown. Their flight feathers have sepia-brown outer webs and grayer inner webs. Their chin and throat are light brown. Their breast is washed with fiery red to reddish orange that fades to rusty buff on the lower belly, rusty brown flanks, and buffy white belly and undertail coverts. Their underwing coverts are cream. Both sexes have a yellow iris, a black to blackish bill, and dark gray to black legs and feet.

== Distribution and habitat ==
The scarlet-breasted dacnis is found from Nariño Department in far southwestern Colombia south into northwestern Ecuador to central Los Ríos Province just short of Guayas Province. It inhabits the canopy and edges of humid evergreen forest and secondary forest in the lowlands and foothills. In elevation it reaches 1,000 m (3,300 ft) in Colombia and 600 m (2,000 ft) in Ecuador.

== Behavior ==
=== Movement ===
The scarlet-breasted dacnis is believed to be a year-round resident.

=== Feeding ===
The scarlet-bellied dacnis' diet has not been studied. It is known to include insects and Cecropia Müllerian bodies and assumed to also include fruits and nectar. It forages singly, in pairs, and in family groups and often joins mixed-species feeding flocks. It forages mostly in the forest canopy but lower on the edges.

=== Breeding ===
The scarlet bellied dacnis' breeding season is unknown; some reports place it in the wet season of August to November and others in the dry season. Nothing else is known about the species' breeding biology.

=== Vocalization ===
The scarlet-bellied dacnis' song is "a fast, high, and evenly pitched series of thin notes, tsitsitsitsitsitsitsitsiti". Its call is tz or tze, which can be repeated in succession when foraging".

== Status ==
The IUCN originally in 1988 assessed the scarlet-bellied dacnis as Threatened, then in 1994 as Vulnerable, and since 2025 as being of Least Concern. Its population size is not known and is believed to be decreasing. "Threats to this species include legal and illegal deforestation for expanding pasturelands, palm oil and balsa plantations, illegal logging in protected areas, and legal and illegal mining." A 2010 field guide to the birds of Colombia states it is "locally fairly common". Curiously, another source states that as of 2020 there had been only one report in the country since 1980, but there are many eBird reports since 2000. In Ecuador it is considered "rare to uncommon and local".
