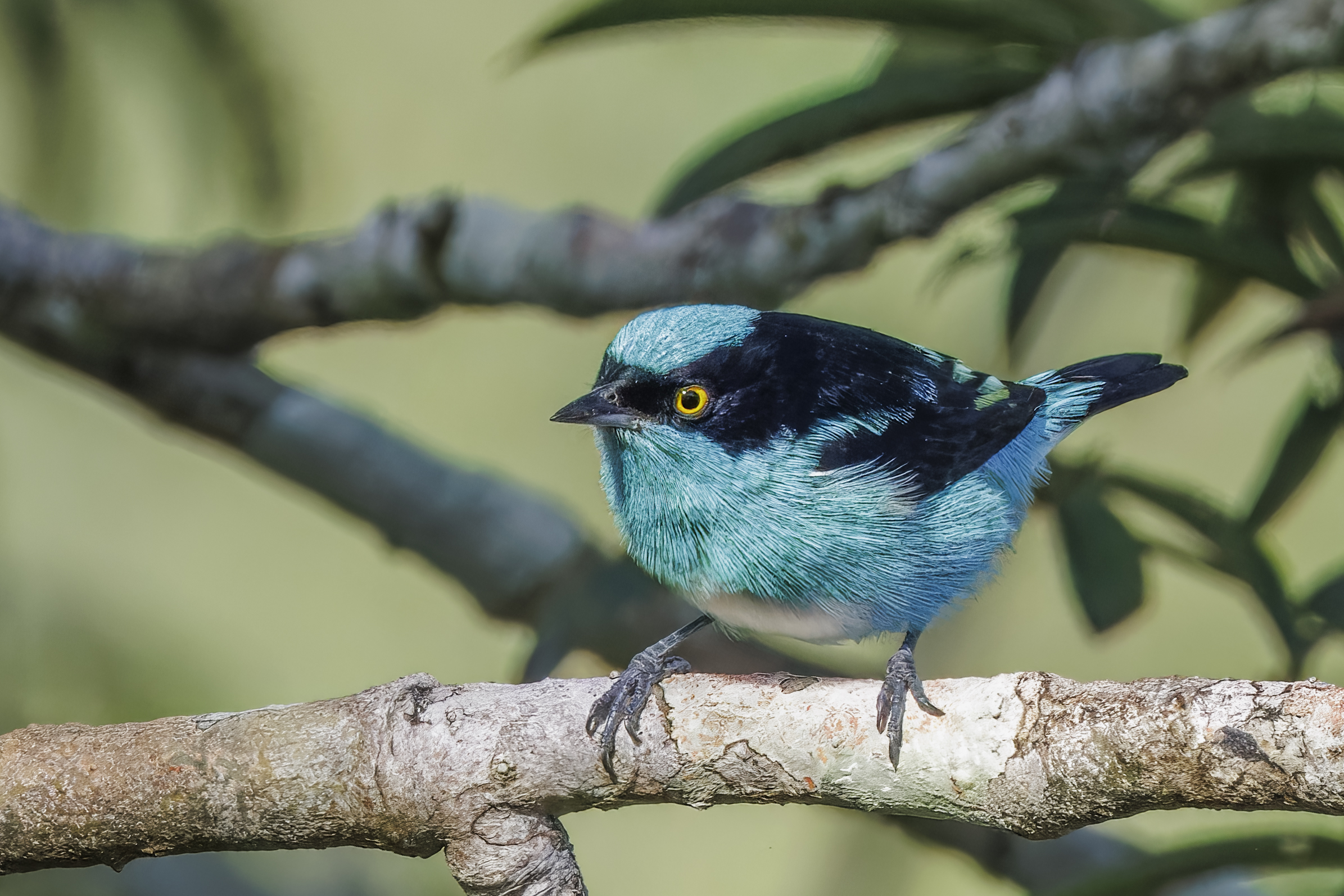
- Male, Ecuador
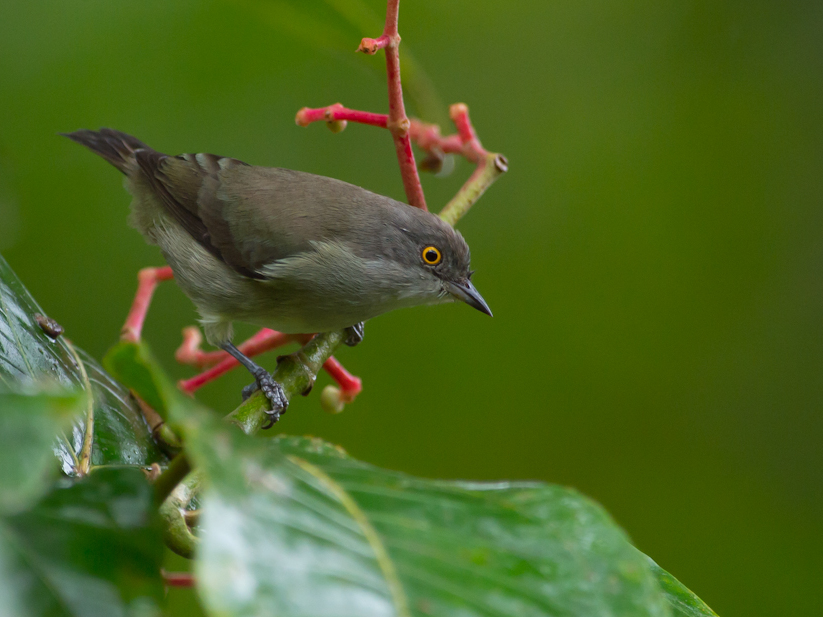
- Female, Peru

Conservation status
- Least Concern (IUCN 3.1)

Scientific classification
- Kingdom: Animalia
- Phylum: Chordata
- Class: Aves
- Order: Passeriformes
- Family: Thraupidae
- Genus: Dacnis
- Species: D. lineata

Binomial name
- Dacnis lineata (Gmelin, JF, 1789)

= Black-faced dacnis =

Species of bird

The black-faced dacnis (Dacnis lineata) is a species of bird in the family Thraupidae, the tanagers and allies. It is found in every mainland South American country except Argentina, Chile, Paraguay, and Uruguay.

== Taxonomy and systematics ==
The black-faced dacnis was formally described in 1789 with the binomial Motacilla lineata.

The species' further taxonomy is unsettled. The South American Classification Committee (SACC), the IOC, and the Clements taxonomy treat it as monotypic. They had previously treated the two subspecies of the yellow-tufted dacnis (D. egregia with aequatorialis) as subspecies of it. BirdLife International's Handbook of the Birds of the World also treats egregia and aequatorialis as the yellow-tufted dacnis, but separates subspecies D. lineata albirostris from D. lineata lineata within the black-faced dacnis.

However, in its initial 2025 version, AviList declined to split the yellow-tufted dacnis from the black-faced. In light of the decisions by the SACC, IOC, and Clements to split them, AviList is considering adopting the split in its 2026 version.

This article follows the majority monotypic species model.

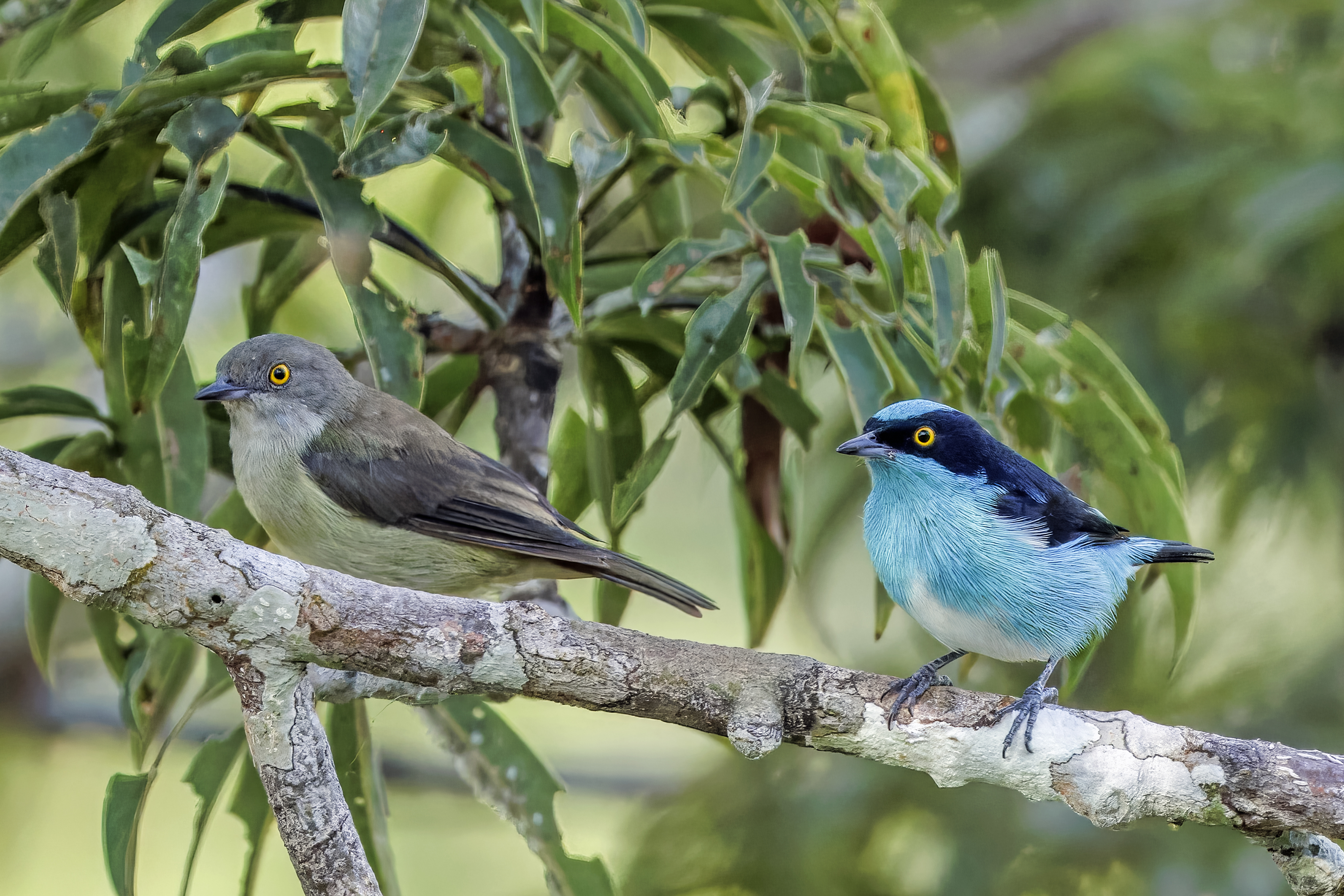
Female and male, Ecuador

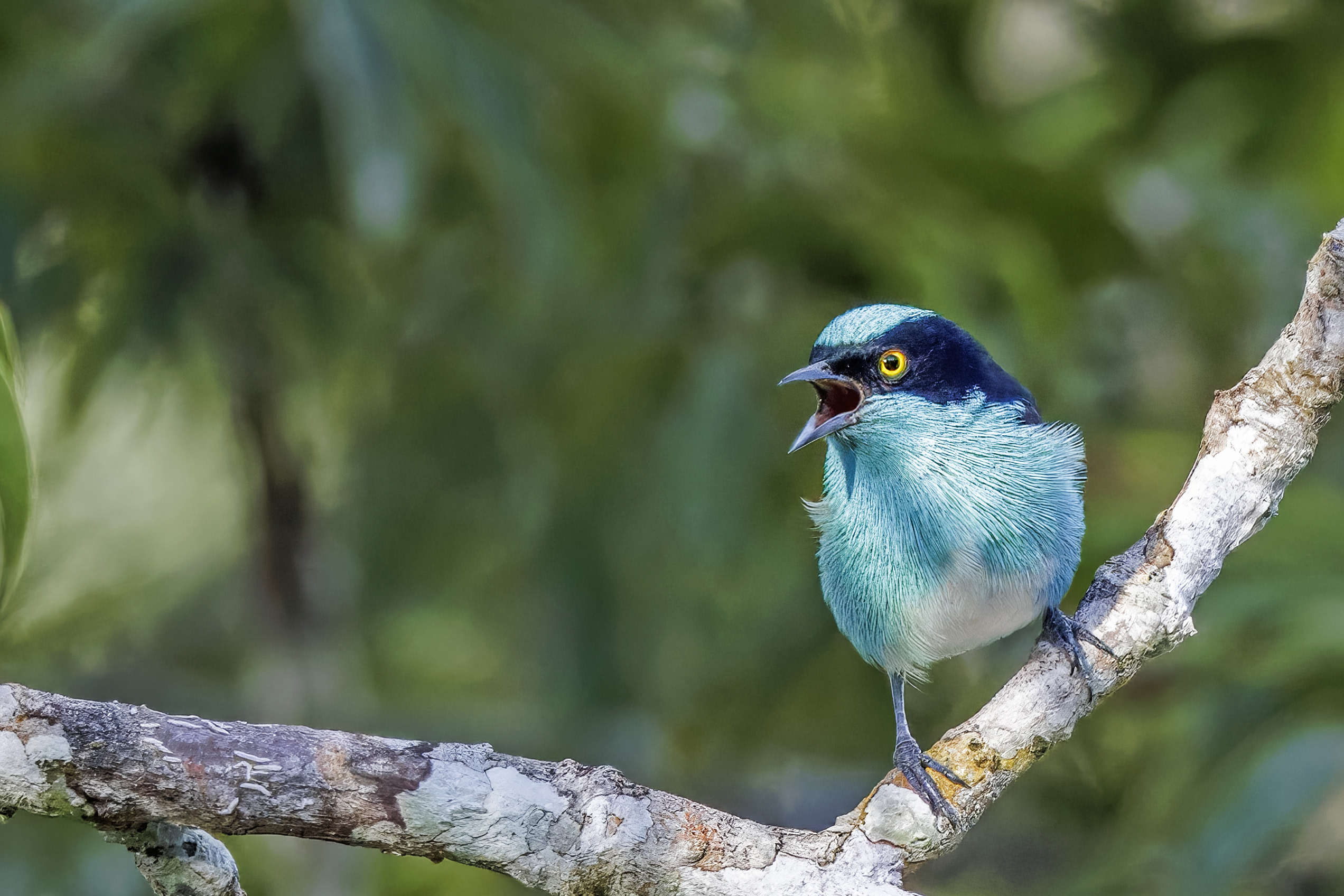
Male, Ecuador

== Description ==
The black-faced dacnis is about 11 cm (4.3 in) long and weighs 9.5 to 13 g (0.34 to 0.46 oz). It has a thin, sharply pointed bill. The species is sexually dimorphic. Adult males have a turquoise blue crown and a wide black mask from just above the bill to past the eye; the color continues around the hindcrown and nape. Their mantle, upper edge of the scapulars, and back are black. The lower edge of the scapulars, rump, and uppertail coverts are turquoise. Their wings and tail are black with turquoise edges on the tertials and innermost secondaries. Their throat, breast, and flanks are turquoise and their belly, undertail coverts, and underwing coverts are white. Adult females have an olive-brown head and upperparts. Their wings and tail are darker brown. Their throat is pale grayish and their breast pale brown to olive-brown that becomes buffy white or whitish on the central belly and undertail coverts. Their underwing coverts are white. Both sexes have a yellow iris, a black bill with a gray base to the mandible, and blackish legs and feet.

== Distribution and habitat ==
The black-faced dacnis is a bird of the Amazon Basin and Guiana Shield. It is found from western Venezuela's southern Táchira south along Colombia's Eastern Andes. From there its range encompasses the southeastern third of Colombia and east through Venezuela's Amazonas and Bolívar states, the Guianas, and northern Brazil. From southeastern Colombia its range continues south through eastern Ecuador and eastern Peru into northwestern and northern Bolivia. From Colombia, Peru, and Bolivia its range extends east through Brazil. There it is found north of a line roughly traced from west-central Mato Grosso east to western Tocantins, from there west and again east on an arc through far western Pará, and then northeast along the north bank of the Amazon River. There is also a disjunct population south of the Amazon in northeastern Pará. (The map does not reflect the Brazilian range as shown in vanPerlo.)

The black-faced dacnis inhabits the canopy and edges of humid terra firme and várzea forest, clearings with scattered trees, and shade coffee plantations. To a much lesser extent it also occurs in gallery forest. In western Venezuela it is found below 450 m (1,500 ft) and reaches 1,300 m (4,300 ft) in the southeast. It reaches 1,200 m (3,900 ft) in Colombia, is mostly below 1,200 m (3,900 ft) in Ecuador, and reaches 1,400 m (4,600 ft) in Peru and Brazil.

== Behavior ==
=== Movement ===
The black-faced dacnis is believed to be a year-round resident.

=== Feeding ===
The black-faced dacnis feeds primarily on arthropods and small fruits, and probably also feeds on nectar. It forages mostly singly and in pairs and sometimes in family groups, and it regularly joins mixed-species feeding flocks. It forages mostly in the forest canopy, actively seeking food in vegetation and sometimes hanging upside down to reach it. It also gleans prey from leaves while briefly hovering after a short sally from a perch.

=== Breeding ===
Nothing is known about the black-faced dacnis' breeding biology.

=== Vocalization ===
The black-faced dacnis is not highly vocal. Its song is "rarely heard, a prolonged series of buzzy notes, both modulated and clear high-pitched calls and loose trills of whistled notes mixed with loud, downslurred cheep calls and more typical tsrrip call notes all jumbled together with no apparent pattern". Its most commonly heard call is the "short (ca. 0.15 s), high-pitched, finely modulated Tsrrip note".

== Status ==
The IUCN has assessed the black-faced dacnis as being of Least Concern. It has an extremely large range; its population size is not known and is believed to be decreasing. No immediate threats have been identified. It is uncommon with "rather spotty" records in Venezuela. It is fairly common in Colombia, "fairly common and widespread" in Peru, and "common to frequent" in Brazil. It is found in a large number of protected areas and its "range also includes vast areas of unprotected habitat that is considered to be at little risk".
