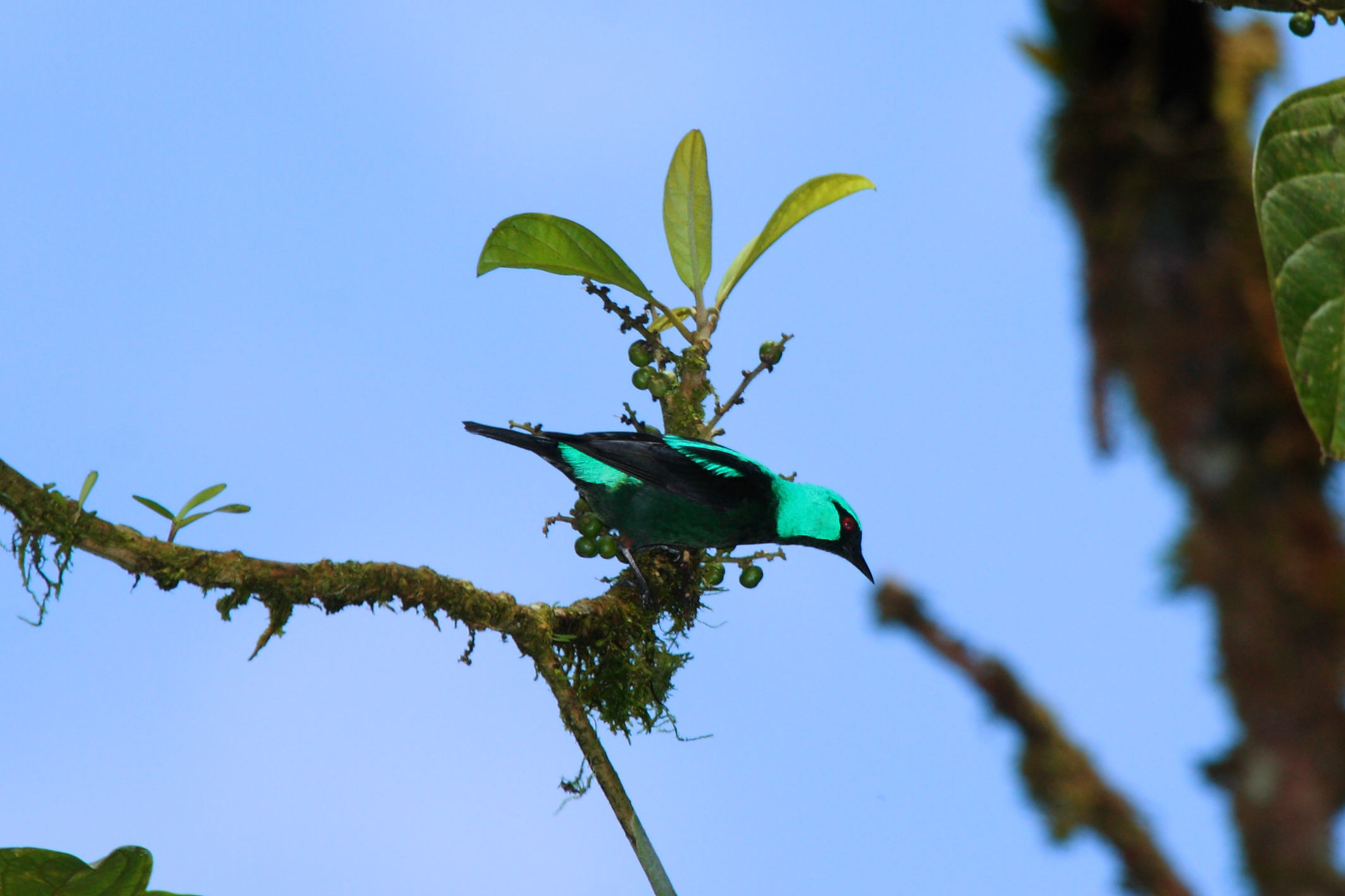
- In Panama

Conservation status
- Least Concern (IUCN 3.1)

Scientific classification
- Kingdom: Animalia
- Phylum: Chordata
- Class: Aves
- Order: Passeriformes
- Family: Thraupidae
- Genus: Dacnis
- Species: D. venusta

Binomial name
- Dacnis venusta Lawrence, 1862

= Scarlet-thighed dacnis =

Species of bird

The scarlet-thighed dacnis (Dacnis venusta) is a species of bird in the family Thraupidae, the tanagers and allies. It is found in Costa Rica, Colombia, Ecuador, and Panama.

== Taxonomy and systematics ==
The scarlet-thighed dacnis was formally described in 1862 with its current binomial Dacnis venusta. The genus Dacnis is from the Greek for an Egyptian bird whose identity is unknown. The specific epithet venusta is from the Latin venustus meaning lovely.

The scarlet-thighed dacnis has two subspecies, the nominate D. v. venusta (Lawrence, 1862) and D. v. fuliginata (Bangs, 1908).

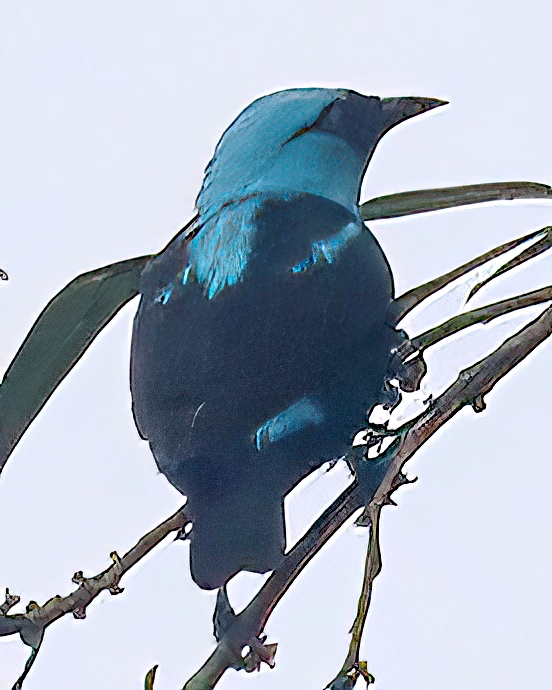
Male at Altos Del Maria, El Valle, Panama

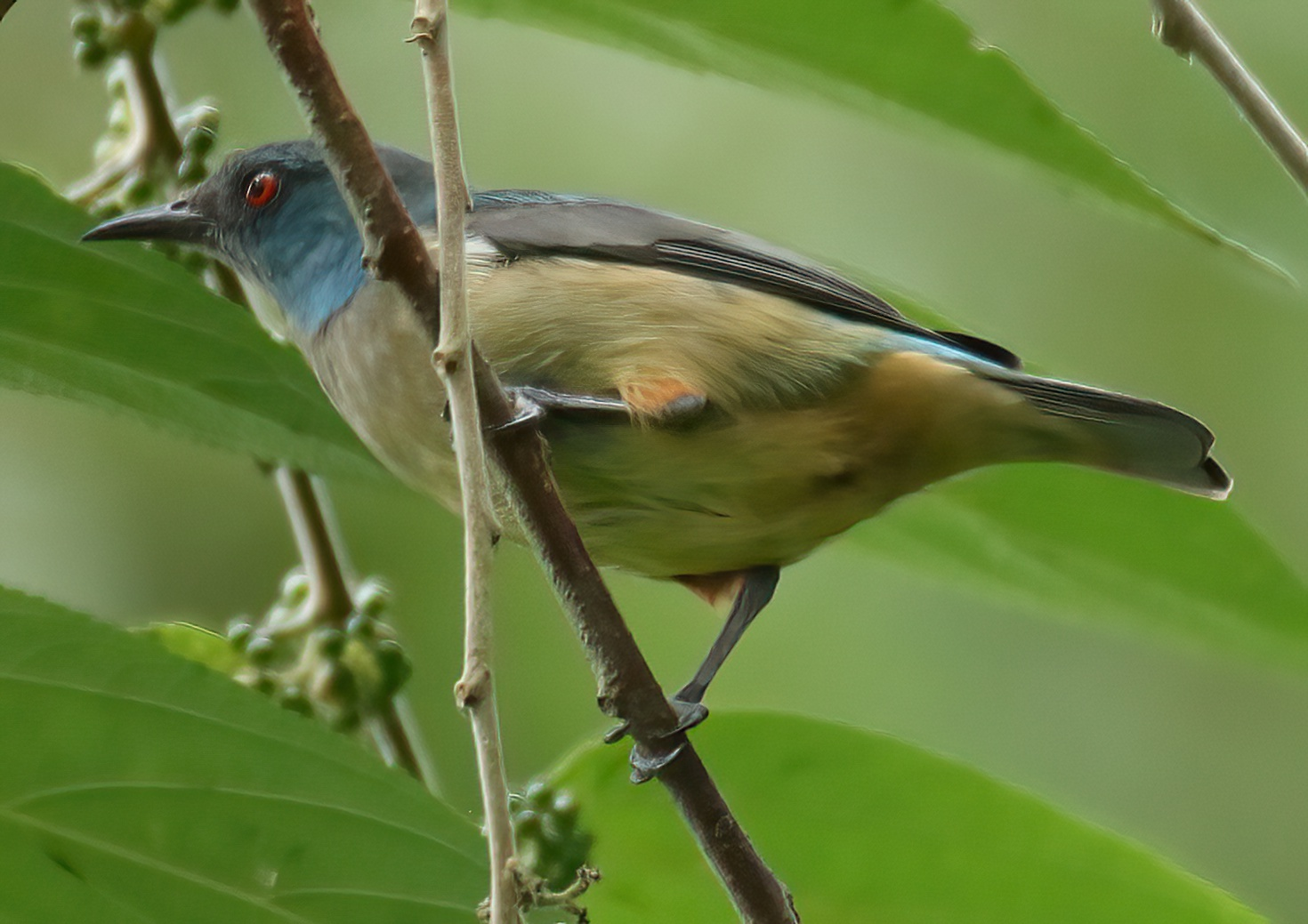
Female at Selva Verde Lodge, Costa Rica

== Description ==
The scarlet-thighed dacnis is 11 to 12 cm (4.3 to 4.7 in) long and weighs 15 to 17 g (0.53 to 0.60 oz). It has a short pointed bill. The species is sexually dimorphic. Adult males of the nominate subspecies have a mostly turquoise-blue head with a triangular black mask from the forehead and lores to just past the eye and extending down the throat. Their back, scapulars, and rump are turquoise-blue. Their longest uppertail coverts are black and the rest turquoise-blue. Their wings and tail are black. Their breast, belly, and undertail coverts are deep greenish black. Their eponymous scarlet thighs are usually not visible. Adult females have a greenish olive head tinged with bright blue on the face. Their upperparts are greenish olive with a bright blue tinge on the scapulars and rump. Their wings and tail are dusky. Their throat is grayish, their upper breast gray-brown, their lower breast, sides, and flanks grayish olive, and their belly and undertail coverts yellowish buff. Their breast has a faint blue tinge. Their thighs have only a tinge of red at their base. Subspecies D. v. fuliginata is smaller than the nominate, and males have deeper sooty black underparts with little or no green. Males of both subspecies have a bright red to deep red iris, a black bill, and dark gray or dusky legs and feet. Females have a dark red to reddish brown iris, a gray maxilla, a black mandible with a gray tip, and gray legs and feet.

== Distribution and habitat ==
The nominate subspecies of the scarlet-thighed dacnis is the more northerly of the two. It is found from the Cordillera de Tilarán in north-central Costa Rica along the Caribbean slope into Panama to the Canal Zone. It also is found on the Pacific slope from Costa Rica's Cordillera de Talamanca into Panama. Subspecies D. v. fuliginata is found from Darién Province in eastern Panama south into Colombia. There it is found on the northern base of the Central Andes and south in the Cauca and Magdalena river valleys. It also continues from Panama south along the Pacific slope of Colombia's Western Andes and into northwestern Ecuador to far northern Guayas Province. The species primarily inhabits the canopy and edges of evergreen forest in the tropical and subtropical zones. It also occurs in gaps caused by fallen trees, around the edges of lakes, in cleared areas that retain a good number of trees, and shady plantations. In elevation in Costa Rica it ranges between 400 and 1,500 m (1,300 and 4,900 ft) on the Pacific slope and between 1,300 and 1,500 m (4,300 and 4,900 ft) on the Caribbean slope. It reaches 1,000 m (3,300 ft) in Colombia and 800 m (2,600 ft) in Ecuador.

== Behavior ==
=== Movement ===
The scarlet-thighed dacnis is a year-round resident.

=== Feeding ===
The scarlet-thighed dacnis feeds on small fruits, arthropods, and nectar. It forages very actively, mostly in the forest subcanopy and canopy but lower on the edges, gleaning prey and fruit from live foliage. It forages singly, in pairs, and in family groups and regularly joins mixed-species feeding flocks.

=== Breeding ===
The scarlet-thighed dacnis' breeding season has not been fully defined but appears to span at least March to July. Its nest is a cup made from plant fibers; one was in a tree about 15 m (50 ft) above the ground. The clutch size, incubation period, time to fledging, and details of parental care are not known.

=== Vocalization ===
The scarlet-thighed dacnis' song is "two to three scratchy, insect-like trills ending with a squeaky bzzeek bzzeek bzzeek". Its calls include "a metallic urp, zirp, rit, or wurt, a buzzy wuzt or rezt, a chirping woit or wheit with an upward inflection, and various scratchy inflecting bzik notes".

== Status ==
The IUCN has assessed the scarlet-thighed dacnis as being of Least Concern. It has a large range; its estimated population of at least 500,000 mature individuals is believed to be decreasing. No immediate threats have been identified. It is considered "fairly common" in Costa Rica, "common" in Colombia, and "scarce" in Ecuador. The species "has a medium sensitivity to human disturbances relative to other Neotropical birds". It occurs in several protected areas in Costa Rica, Panama, and Colombia.
