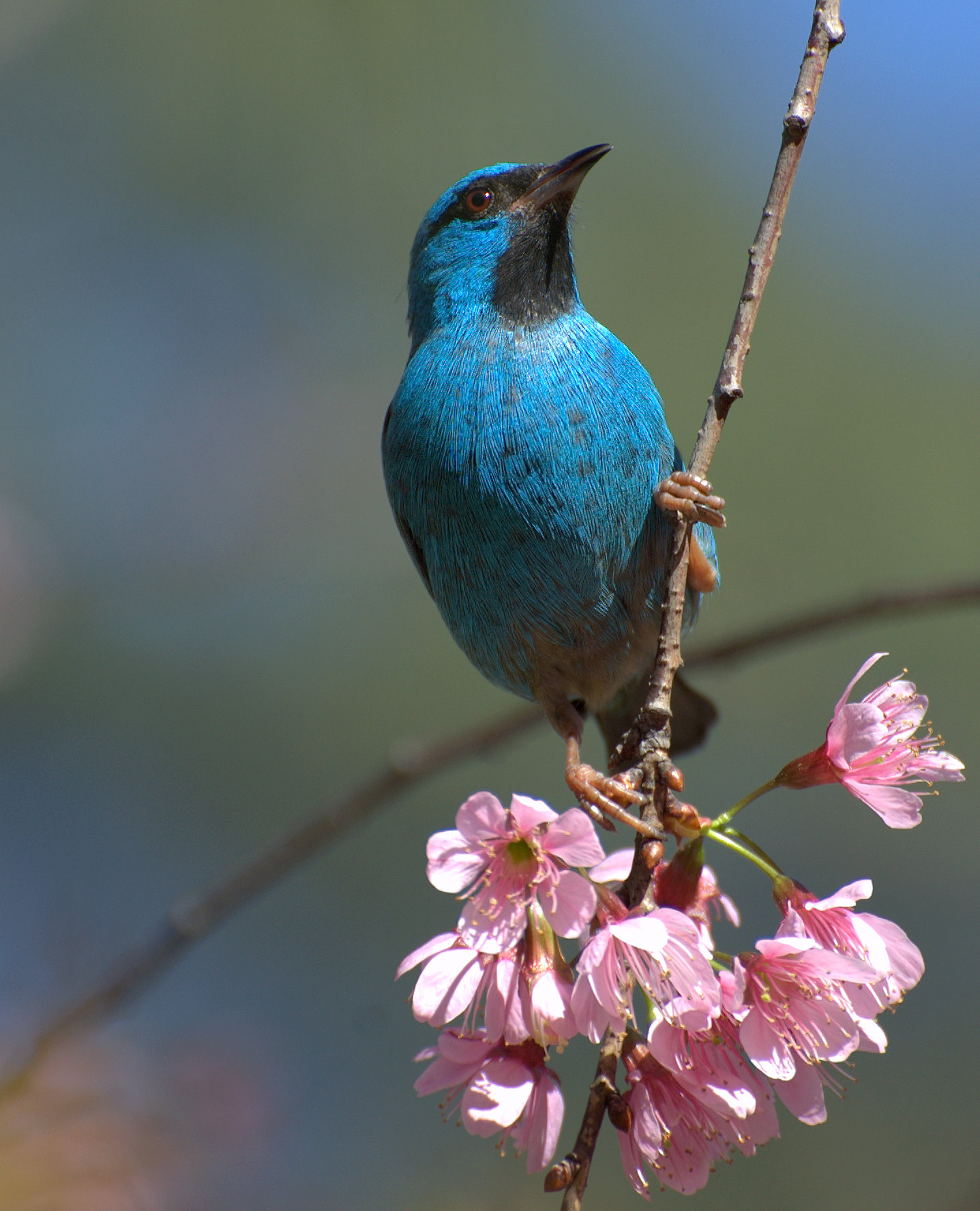
- Blue dacnis (Dacnis cayana)

Scientific classification
- Kingdom: Animalia
- Phylum: Chordata
- Class: Aves
- Order: Passeriformes
- Family: Thraupidae
- Genus: Dacnis; Cuvier, 1816

Type species
- Motacilla cayana Linnaeus, 1766

Species
- 10, see text

Synonyms
- Pseudodacnis Sclater, PL, 1886

= Dacnis =

Genus of birds

Dacnis is a genus of Neotropical birds in the tanager family Thraupidae.

These are highly sexually dichromatic species with bright blue males and green females. They have various bill types and many of them feed on nectar.

== Taxonomy and species list ==
The genus Dacnis was introduced in 1816 by the French naturalist Georges Cuvier with the blue dacnis as the type species. The name is from the Ancient Greek daknis, an unidentified bird from Egypt listed by Hesychius of Alexandria and Sextus Pompeius Festus. This genus is placed together with the genera Tersina and Cyanerpes in the subfamily Dacninae.

The genus contains the following ten species:

Image	Scientific name	Common name	Distribution
	Dacnis berlepschi	Scarlet-breasted dacnis	Colombia and Ecuador
	Dacnis venusta	Scarlet-thighed dacnis	Costa Rica, Colombia, Ecuador and Panama.
	Dacnis cayana	Blue dacnis	Nicaragua to Panama, on Trinidad, and in South America south to Bolivia and northern Argentina
	Dacnis flaviventer	Yellow-bellied dacnis	Amazonian regions of Colombia, Ecuador, Peru, Bolivia and Brazil; also the eastern Orinoco River region of Venezuela.
	Dacnis hartlaubi	Turquoise dacnis	Colombia.
	Dacnis lineata	Black-faced dacnis	Amazon and the Chocó-Magdalena.
	Dacnis egregia	Yellow-tufted dacnis	Colombia and Ecuador
	Dacnis viguieri	Viridian dacnis	Colombia and Panama.
	Dacnis nigripes	Black-legged dacnis	Brazil.
	Dacnis albiventris	White-bellied dacnis	Brazil, Colombia, Ecuador, Peru, and Venezuela.
