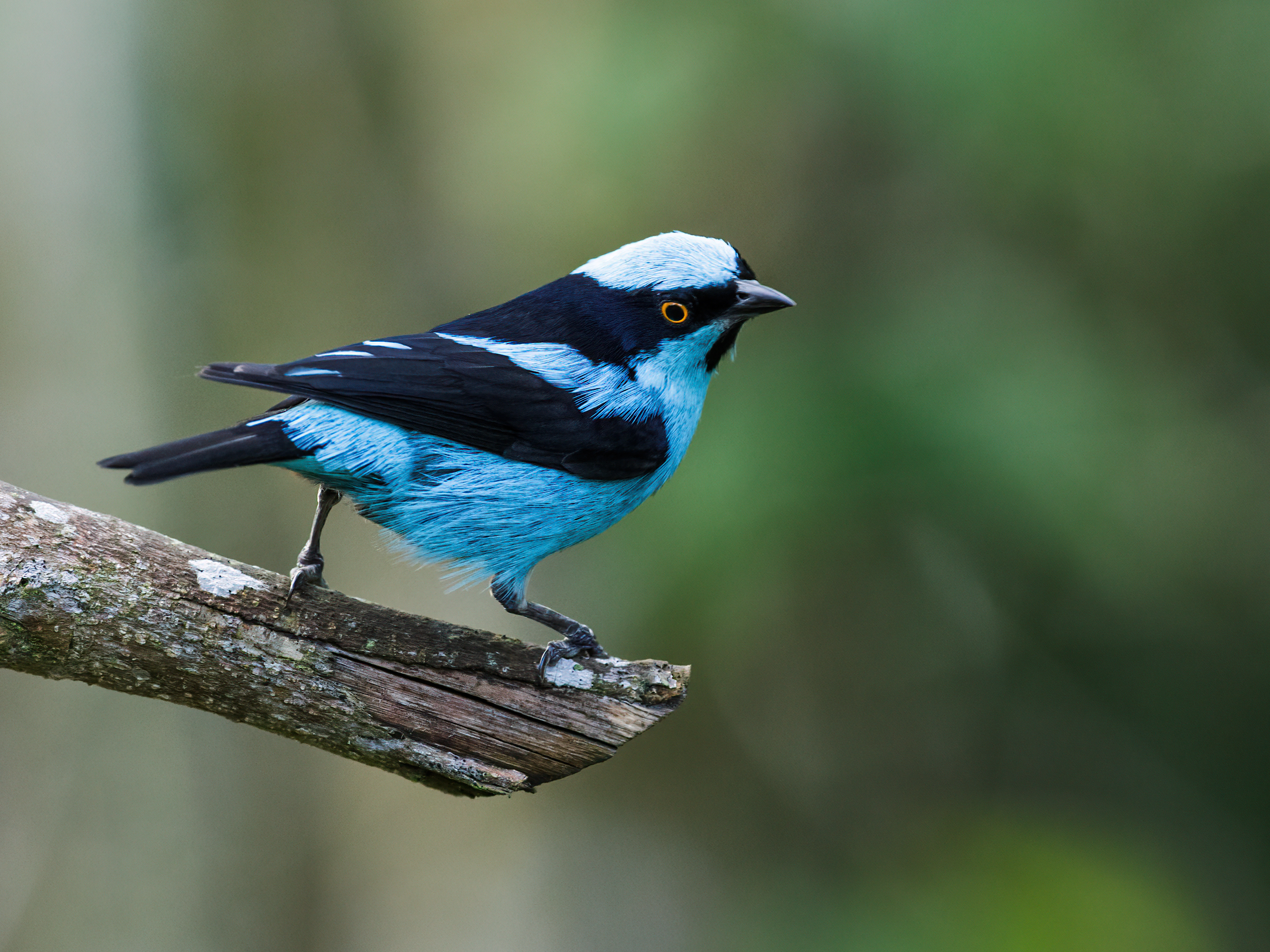

Conservation status
- Near Threatened (IUCN 3.1)

Scientific classification
- Kingdom: Animalia
- Phylum: Chordata
- Class: Aves
- Order: Passeriformes
- Family: Thraupidae
- Genus: Dacnis
- Species: D. hartlaubi

Binomial name
- Dacnis hartlaubi Sclater, PL, 1855

= Turquoise dacnis =

Species of bird

The turquoise dacnis (Dacnis hartlaubi) is a species of bird in the family Thraupidae, the tanagers and allies. It is endemic to Colombia.

== Taxonomy and systematics ==
The turquoise dacnis was formally described in 1855 with its current binomial Dacnis hartlaubi. Several twentieth century authors placed it in its own genus, Pseudodacnis, though by the 1970s most taxonomists returned it to Dacnis. The species is monotypic.

== Description ==
The turquoise dacnis is 11 to 11.5 cm (4.3 to 4.5 in) long. It has a thick, rather heavy, bill. The species is sexually dimorphic. Adult males have a wide black mask from just above the bill to past the eye and around the lower nape. The rest of their head is turquoise. Their mantle is black. Their scapulars, the sides of their back, and their rump and uppertail coverts are turquoise. Their wings and tail are black with blue edges and tips on the tertials. They have a thin black throat patch. Their underparts are turquoise. Adult females have a brownish head and upperparts. Their wings and tail are brownish with thin buff edges on the wing coverts and flight feathers. Their throat and breast are pale gray buff that slightly yellows on the belly. Both sexes have a blackish bill and dark gray legs and feet. Males have a bright yellow iris and females an orange yellow one.

== Distribution and habitat ==
The turquoise dacnis is found locally at a few sites in Colombia's Western, Central, and Eastern Andes. It primarily inhabits the edges of montane evergreen forest and also is found in secondary forest and shade coffee plantations. In elevation it ranges from 1,000 to 2,200 m (3,300 to 7,200 ft).

== Behavior ==
=== Movement ===
The turquoise dacnis is a year-round resident.

=== Feeding ===
The diet of the turquoise dacnis has not been studied, but the species has been observed feeding on insects, fruits, and nectar. It mostly forages singly but will form small groups. One source reports that it joins mixed-species feeding flocks but another says it does not.

=== Breeding ===
The turquoise dacnis' breeding season had not been defined but apparently includes March and August. Nothing else is known about the species' breeding biology.

=== Vocalization ===
What is thought to be the turquoise dacnis' song is "a three-note introduction of high pitched, thin, buzz-like tzzleet followed by a high trill". Its call is "a flat, indistinct, high-pitched single-note tsit or sic".

== Status ==
The IUCN originally in 1988 assessed the turquoise dacnis as Threatened, then in 1994 as Vulnerable, and since 2024 as Near Threatened. It has a limited and disjunct distribution; its estimated population of between 2500 and 10,000 mature individuals is believed to be decreasing. "The likely cause for the population decline is the loss and degradation of suitable habitat." It occurs in a few protected areas.
