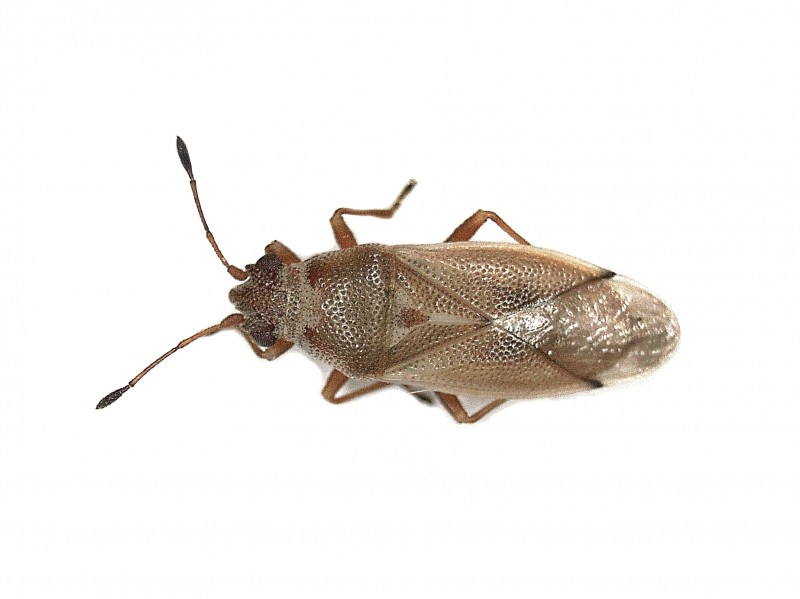
- Cymus melanocephalus, the Netherlands

Scientific classification
- Domain: Eukaryota
- Kingdom: Animalia
- Phylum: Arthropoda
- Class: Insecta
- Order: Hemiptera
- Suborder: Heteroptera
- Family: Cymidae
- Genus: Cymus
- Species: C. melanocephalus

Binomial name
- Cymus melanocephalus Fieber, 1861

= Cymus melanocephalus =

Species of pentatomomorphan bug

Cymus melanocephalus is a species of pentatomomorphan bug in the family Cymidae, found in the Palearctic.

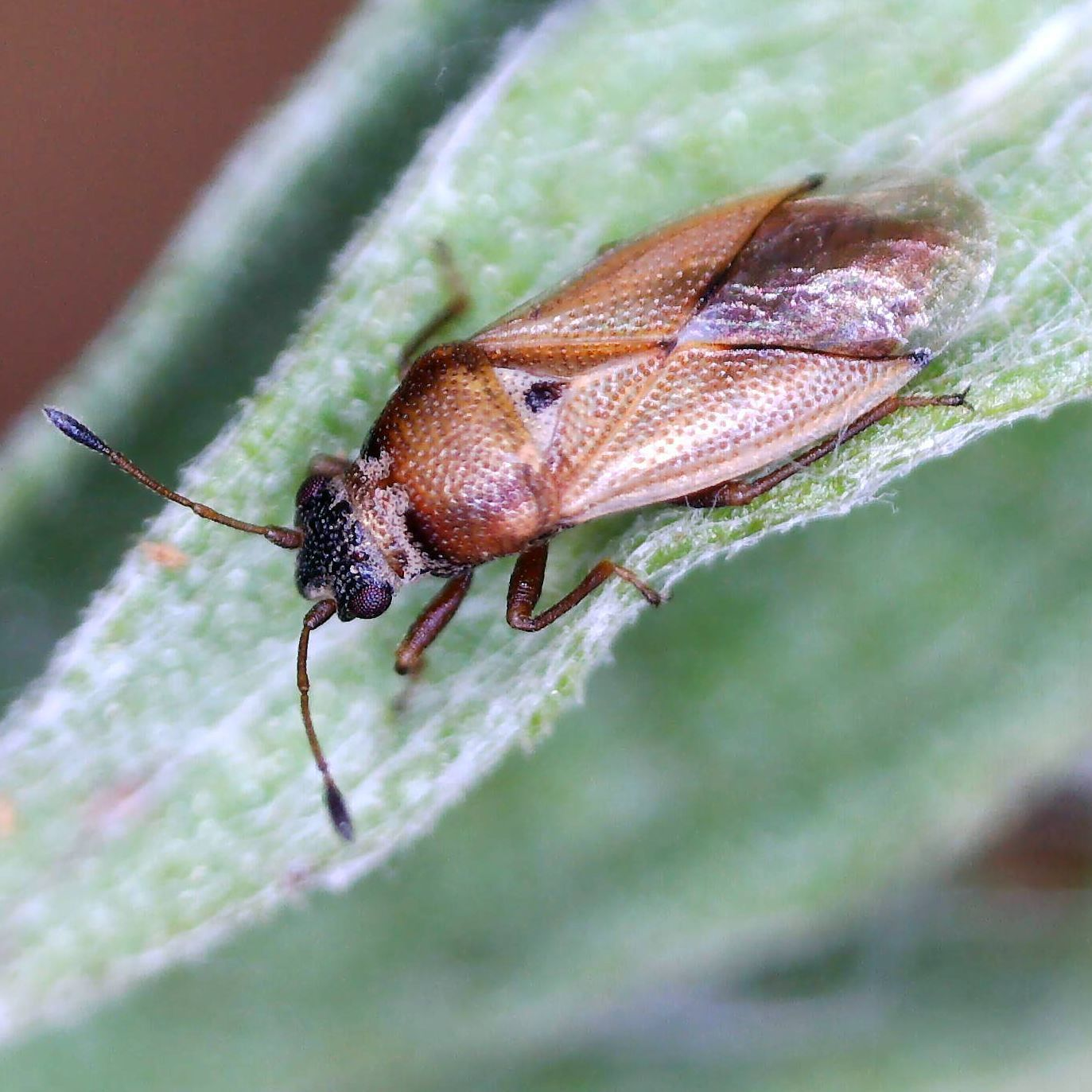
Cymus melanocephalus, United Kingdom
