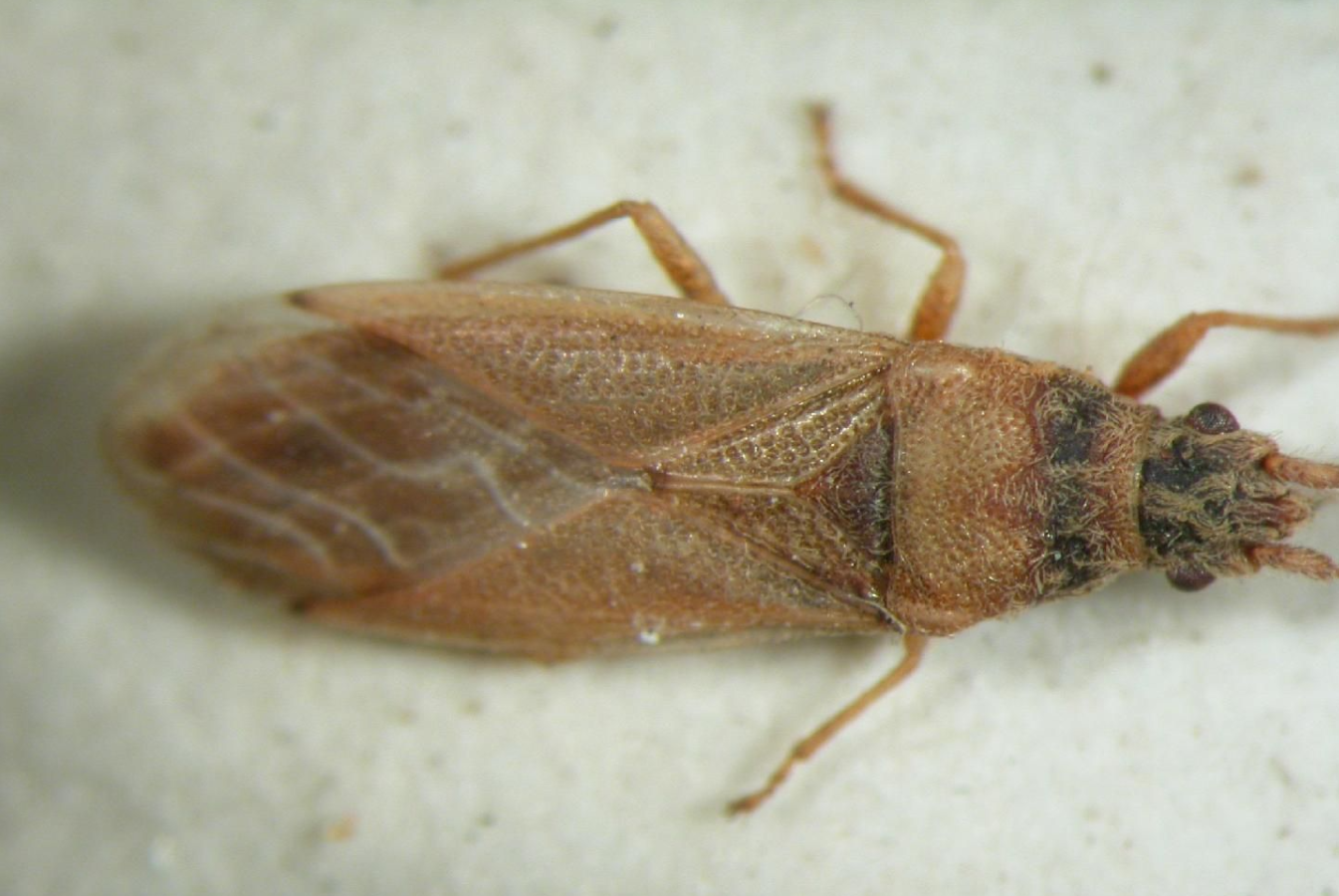

Scientific classification
- Kingdom: Animalia
- Phylum: Arthropoda
- Clade: Pancrustacea
- Class: Insecta
- Order: Hemiptera
- Suborder: Heteroptera
- Family: Cymidae
- Subfamily: Ontiscinae
- Genus: Sephora; Kirkaldy, 1902

= Sephora (bug) =

Genus of true bugs

Sephora is a genus of true bugs in the family Cymidae. There is at least one described species in Sephora, S. criniger. Specimens of S. criniger have been collected from the islands of Lānaʻi and Molokaʻi in the Hawaiian Islands, where they are often associated with gray birch trees.
