= Blackleg =

Blackleg, blacklegs or black-legged may refer to:

== Disease ==
- Blackleg (disease), in sheep and cattle
- Blackleg (Brassica) in rapeseed and other mustard-and-cabbage-family plants, caused by fungus Leptosphaeria maculans
- Blackleg (potatoes), caused by Pectobacterium carotovorum
- Blackleg (geraniums), caused by a form of the quasi-fungus Pythium
- Scurvy, vitamin deficiency in primates and some other animals

== Species ==
- Black-leg, a common name for the polypore fungus Royoporus badius
- Black-legged kittiwake, seagull species
- Black-legged seriema, seriema bird species
- Blackleg tortoiseshell, another name for the large tortoiseshell butterfly
- Animals named as black-legged
- Black-legged tick, Ixodes scapularis and Ixodes pacificus

== Other uses ==
- Blacklegs (horse), a racehorse
- Opelousa people, historical Native American tribe of Louisiana
- Blackleg labour (or strikebreaking)
- Card sharp
- Operation Blackleg, dive operation on warship HMS Coventry (D118)

== See also ==
- Blackley, Manchester, England
- Blackledge (disambiguation)
- Black Legion (disambiguation)
