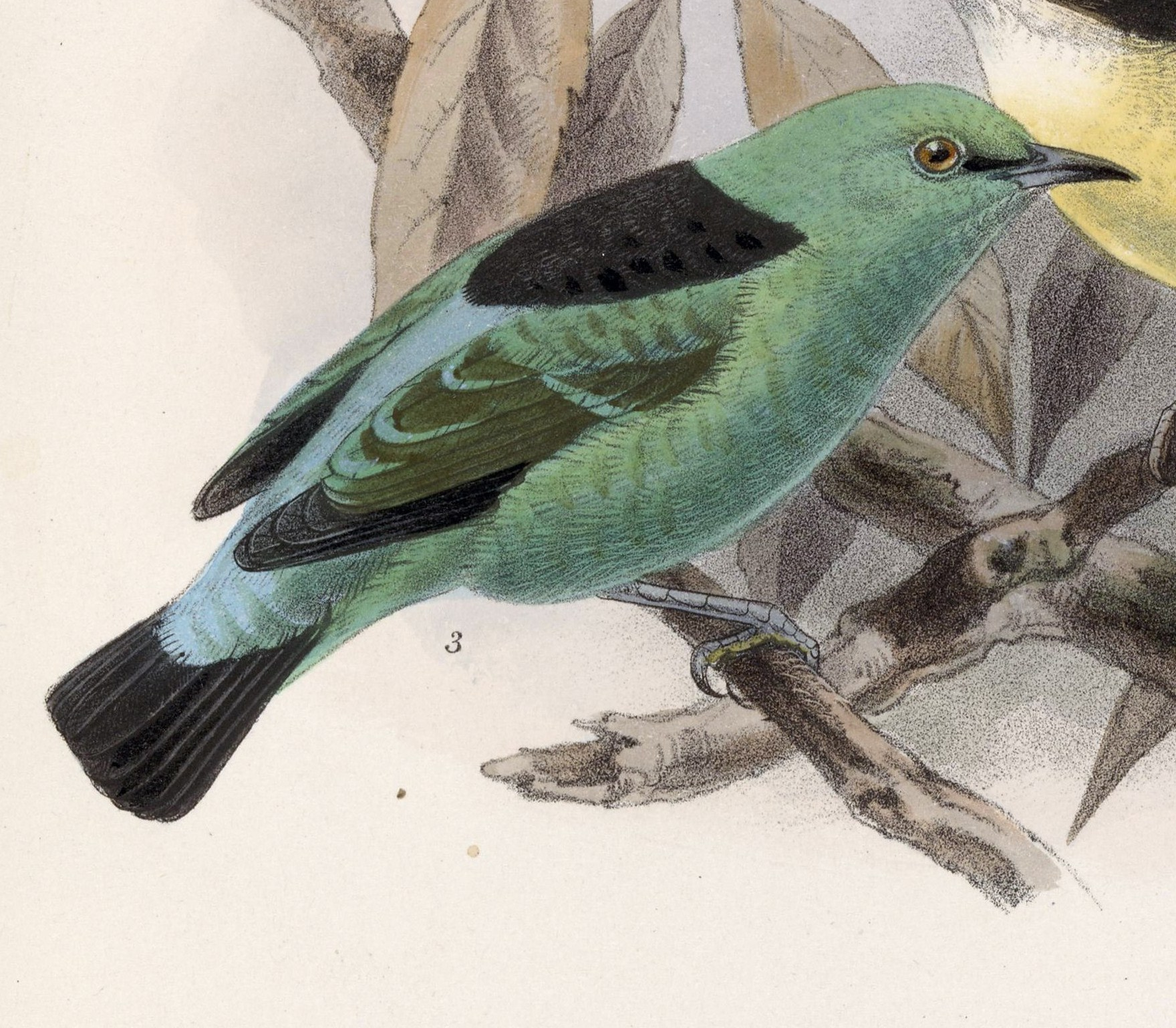
- Illustration by John Gerrard Keulemans

Conservation status
- Least Concern (IUCN 3.1)

Scientific classification
- Kingdom: Animalia
- Phylum: Chordata
- Class: Aves
- Order: Passeriformes
- Family: Thraupidae
- Genus: Dacnis
- Species: D. viguieri

Binomial name
- Dacnis viguieri Oustalet, 1883

= Viridian dacnis =

Species of bird

The viridian dacnis (Dacnis viguieri) is a species of bird in the family Thraupidae, the tanagers and allies. It is found in Colombia and Panama.

== Taxonomy and systematics ==
The viridian dacnis was formally described in 1883 with its current binomial Dacnis viguieri. The species is monotypic.

== Description ==
The viridian dacnis is 9.5 to 10.5 cm (3.7 to 4.1 in) long. It has a short, conical, sharply pointed bill. The species is sexually dimorphic. Adult males have a green head with dusky lores. Their mantle has a triangular black patch. Their lower back and rump are greenish blue and their uppertail coverts blue. Their wing's inner coverts and flight feathers are bright olive green with blue edges and the outer coverts and primaries are black. Their tail is dusky. The green of the head becomes greenish blue on the throat, breast, belly, and undertail coverts. Adult females have a green head, a pale olive green nape, back, and rump, and blue-tinged olive uppertail coverts. Their wings are mostly olive green with greenish-edged outer primaries. Their tail is dusky. Their throat and underparts are mostly pale yellowish olive with a pale buff center to the belly and yellow undertail coverts. Both sexes have a yellow iris, a black bill, and gray legs and feet.

== Distribution and habitat ==
The viridian dacnis straddles the border between Panama and Colombia. In the former it is found in far eastern Darién Province. In Colombia it is found around the Gulf of Urabá in northern Chocó, northern Antioquia, and western Córdoba departments. It inhabits the canopy and edges of humid tropical evergreen forest. In elevation it ranges from sea level to 600 m (2,000 ft).

== Behavior ==
=== Movement ===
The viridian dacnis is a year-round resident.

=== Feeding ===
The viridian dacnis' diet and foraging behavior have not been studied. They are assumed to be similar to those of other Dacnis species, for example see here.

=== Breeding ===
The breeding biology of the viridan dacnis is assumed to be similar to those of other Dacnis species, for example see here.

=== Vocalization ===
As of August 2026 xeno-canto had a single recording of a viridian dacnis vocalization; the Cornell Lab of Ornithology's Macaulay Library had none.

== Status ==
The IUCN originally in 1994 assessed the viridian dacnis as Near Threatened and since 2019 as being of Least Concern. It has a restricted range; its estimated population of between 10,000 and 20,000 mature individuals is believed to be decreasing. "In the Urabá lowlands and the Sinú valley, most habitat has been converted to banana plantations and cattle ranches...and more recently palm oil plantations...Some extensive, largely intact forests remain in Panama and Chocó, but these would be threatened by the completion of the Pan-American highway through Daríen." An observer is estimated to have a less than 10% chance of finding the species in Panama. It is "local and uncommon" in Colombia. It is known from one national park in each country.
