= Cymodema =

Scientific classification
- Domain: Eukaryota
- Kingdom: Animalia
- Phylum: Arthropoda
- Class: Insecta
- Order: Hemiptera
- Suborder: Heteroptera
- Family: Cymidae
- Genus: Cymodema; Spinola, 1837

Genus of true bugs

Cymodema is a genus of true bugs in the family Cymidae. There are about seven described species in Cymodema.

== Species ==
These seven species belong to the genus Cymodema:

- Cymodema angustiformis Linnavuori, 1978
- Cymodema barberi Hamid, 1975
- Cymodema basicornis (Motschulsky, 1863)
- Cymodema breviceps (Stal, 1874)
- Cymodema mauritii (Stal, 1859)
- Cymodema robusta Linnavuori, 1978
- Cymodema tabidum Spinola, 1837
