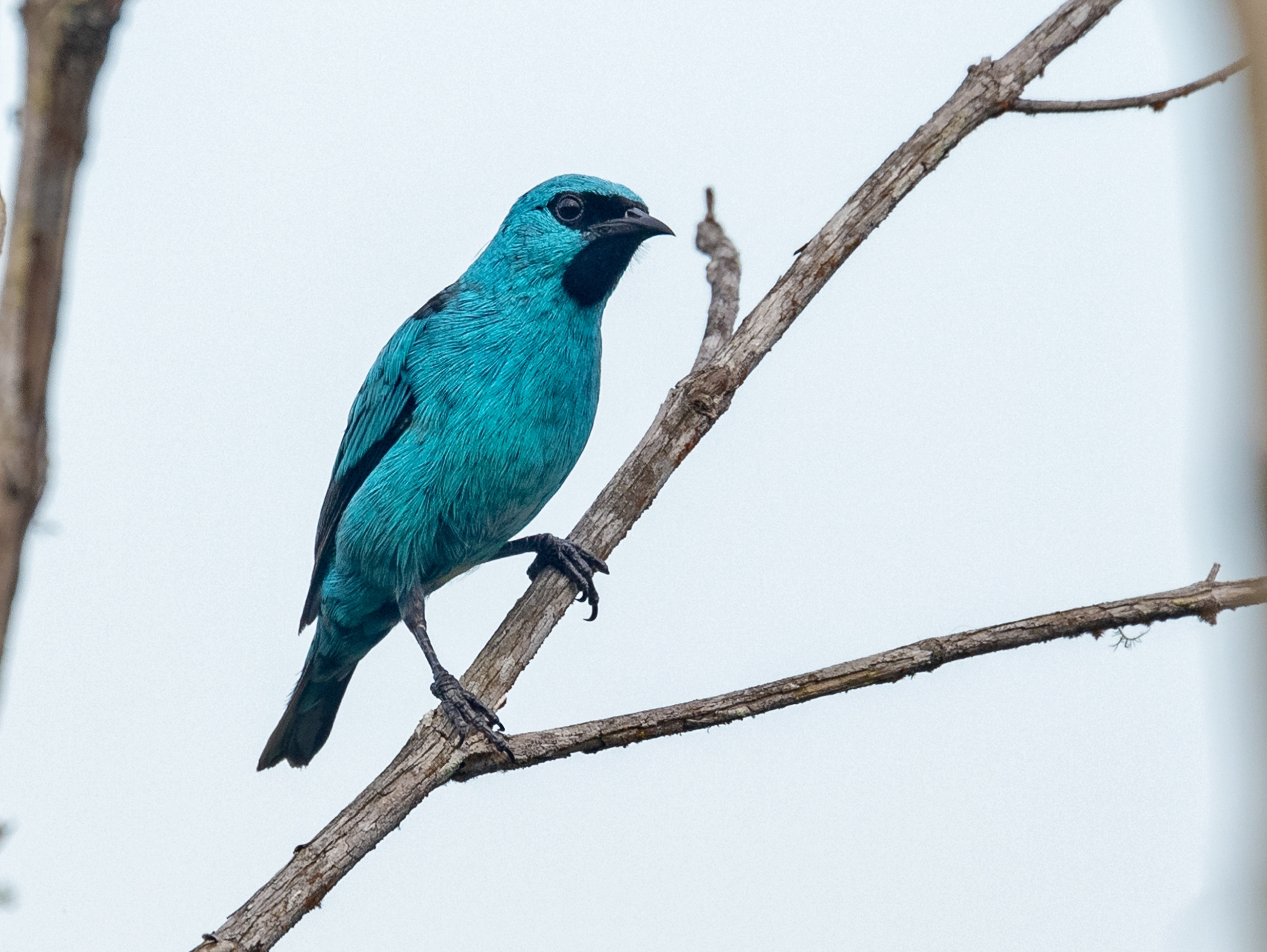

Conservation status
- Near Threatened (IUCN 3.1)

Scientific classification
- Kingdom: Animalia
- Phylum: Chordata
- Class: Aves
- Order: Passeriformes
- Family: Thraupidae
- Genus: Dacnis
- Species: D. nigripes

Binomial name
- Dacnis nigripes Pelzeln, 1856

= Black-legged dacnis =

Species of bird

The black-legged dacnis (Dacnis nigripes) is a Near Threatened species of bird in the family Thraupidae, the tanagers and allies. It is endemic to Brazil.

== Taxonomy and systematics ==
The black-legged dacnis was formally described in 1856 with its current binomial Dacnis nigripes. The species is monotypic.

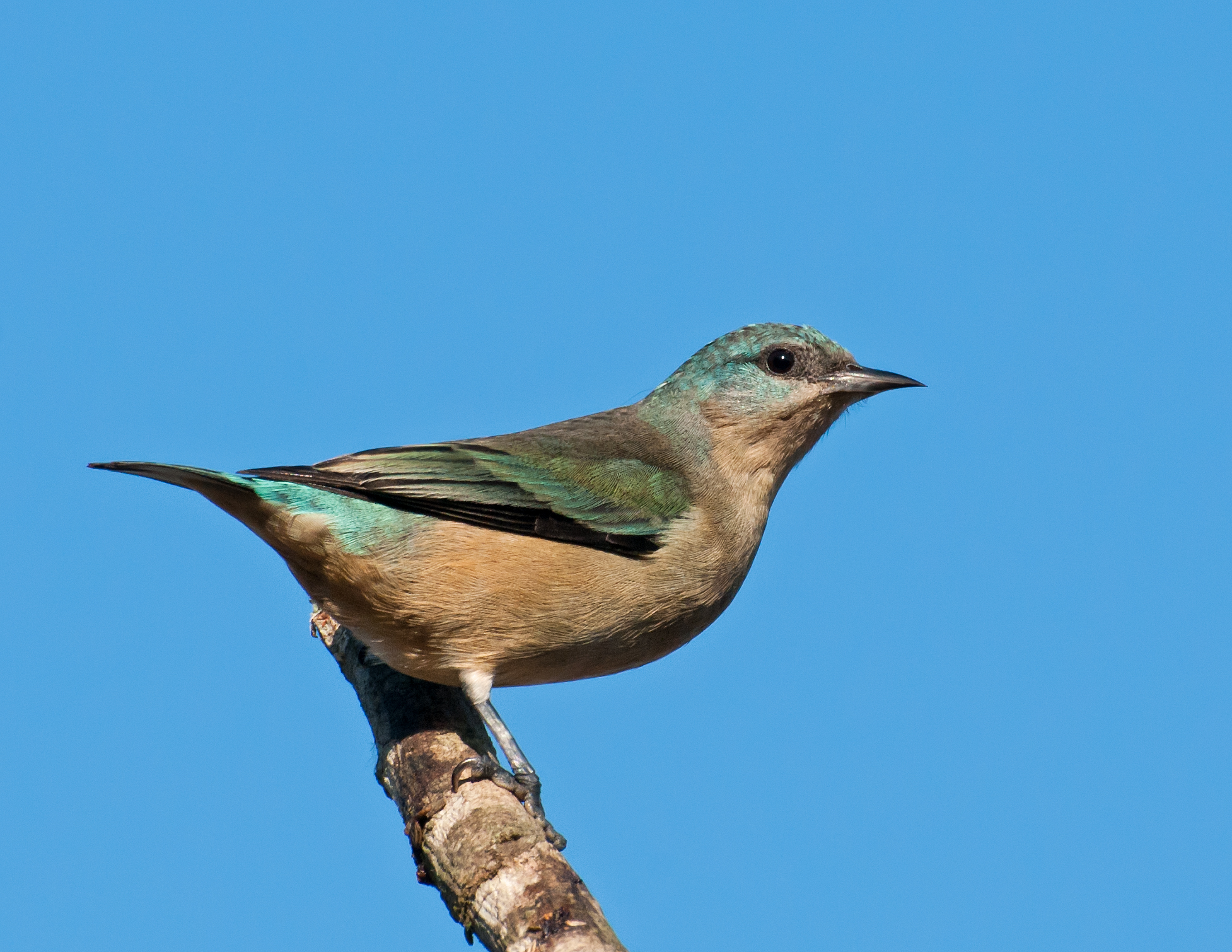
Female in São Paulo, Brazil

== Description ==
The black-legged dacnis is 11 cm (4.3 in) long and weighs about 14 g (0.49 oz). The species is sexually dimorphic. Adult males have a mostly greenish blue to turquoise head and nape with a small black mask from the lores to behind the eye. Their mantle has a triangular black patch. Their scapulars are turquoise and their back, rump, and uppertail coverts light turquoise to greenish blue. Their wing's coverts and inner flight feathers are black with blue edges and the outer flight feathers are black. Their tail is black with blue edges on the outermost pair of feathers. They have a thin black throat patch and light turquoise underparts. Adult females have a mostly brownish olive head with a greenish to turquoise blue wash on the forecrown and cheeks. Their upperparts are also mostly brownish olive, with a greenish to turquoise blue wash on the scapulars and rump. Their wings are brownish olive and their tail is dusky. Their throat and underparts are dull buff. Both sexes have a dark reddish brown or brown iris, a black bill, and black or dusky legs and feet.

== Distribution and habitat ==
The black-legged dacnis is found intermittently in the Serra do Mar region of southeastern Brazil from central Espírito Santo south to Santa Catarina state. It is a bird of the Atlantic Forest where it inhabits humid forest and woodlands both primary and secondary. It also is found in smaller patches of forest. In elevation it ranges from sea level to 1,700 m (5,600 ft).

== Behavior ==
=== Movement ===
The black-legged dacnis is a year-round resident though it apparently roams in search of food sources.

=== Feeding ===
The black-legged dacnis feeds primarily on insects, fruits, and nectar with smaller amounts of seeds. It often forages in groups of up to about five individuals and regularly joins mixed-species feeding flocks. It typically forages from the forest's mid-level to the canopy, taking much food by gleaning while perched and sometimes taking insects in mid-air.

=== Breeding ===
The black-legged dacnis' breeding season has not been fully defined but spans at least October to February. It nests in loose association with others of its species and other birds, usually near good food sources. Its nest is a cup made mostly from Usnea lichen that is well-hidden in a tree among foliage, lichen, and bromeliads. The clutch is two eggs. The female alone incubates, for about 14 days. Fledging occurs 13 to 14 days after hatch and both parents provision nestlings.

=== Vocalization ===
As of August 2026 xeno-canto had four recordings of black-legged dacnis calls; the Cornell Lab of Ornithology's Macaulay Library had 10 recordings with some overlap. Two of the Macaulay recordings were of song. The species' song has not been described. Its calls include "a high pitched and sharp sweet" and "a nasal ñih".

== Status ==
The IUCN originally in 1988 assessed the black-legged dacnis as Threatened, then in 1994 as Vulnerable, and since 2004 as Near Threatened. It has a small and fragmented range; its estimated population of 6700 mature individuals is believed to be decreasing. "It is threatened by widespread habitat loss throughout its range, and is also at risk from the (illegal) cage-bird trade, which prizes it for its rarity." It is considered "uncommon to rare". It occurs in several protected areas and "there are hopes that with the increase of literature written on this bird, conservation efforts will increase".
