= Black Army =

Black Army may refer to several different groups and affiliations:

- Black Army of Hungary, the royal army of Matthias Corvinus, a 15th-century king of Hungary
- Black Flag Army (1857–1895), a splinter remnant of the Taiping rebels
- Black Guards (1917–1919), several anarchist factions of the Russian Civil War
- Revolutionary Insurgent Army of Ukraine (1918–1921), led by Nestor Makhno, also known as the Black Army
- Armata Neagră (1949–1950), an anti-Soviet group in Bessarabia
- Black Legion (Ustaše militia) (1941–1945), Ustaše genocidal militia infantry unit active during World War II in Croatia
- Black Army, supporter group of the Swedish sports club AIK
- Black Army of Sudan, is the female faction of the Popular Resistance of Sudan

== See also ==
- Blackguard (disambiguation)
- Black Legion (disambiguation)
