= The Blackguard (novel) =

1923 novel by Raymond Paton

The Blackguard is 1923 novel by Raymond Paton. It is a melodrama set during the Russian Revolution of 1917: a French violinist rescues a Russian princess from execution at the hands of revolutionaries led by his former mentor. The novel was adapted into film in 1925 on a screenplay by Alfred Hitchcock.

The book is generally known as The Autobiography of a Blackguard.

== Reception ==
A 1933 review found it was "an extraordinary novel with a rather worn theme the life of a musical genius - treated in a new way. It has a full share of Russian horrors, a store of luridness ..." Another review found it was an "extraordinarily interesting novel that defied adequate description in a brief review".

== Adaptation ==
The film was adapted for the screen when a silent film The Blackguard (1925) was made as a co-production between the British Gainsborough Pictures and the German UFA Studios. The film was directed by Graham Cutts.

== Bibliography ==
- Cook, Pam (ed.). Gainsborough Pictures. Cassell, 1997.
- Kreimeier, Klaus. The Ufa story: a history of Germany's greatest film company, 1918-1945. University of California Press, 1999.
