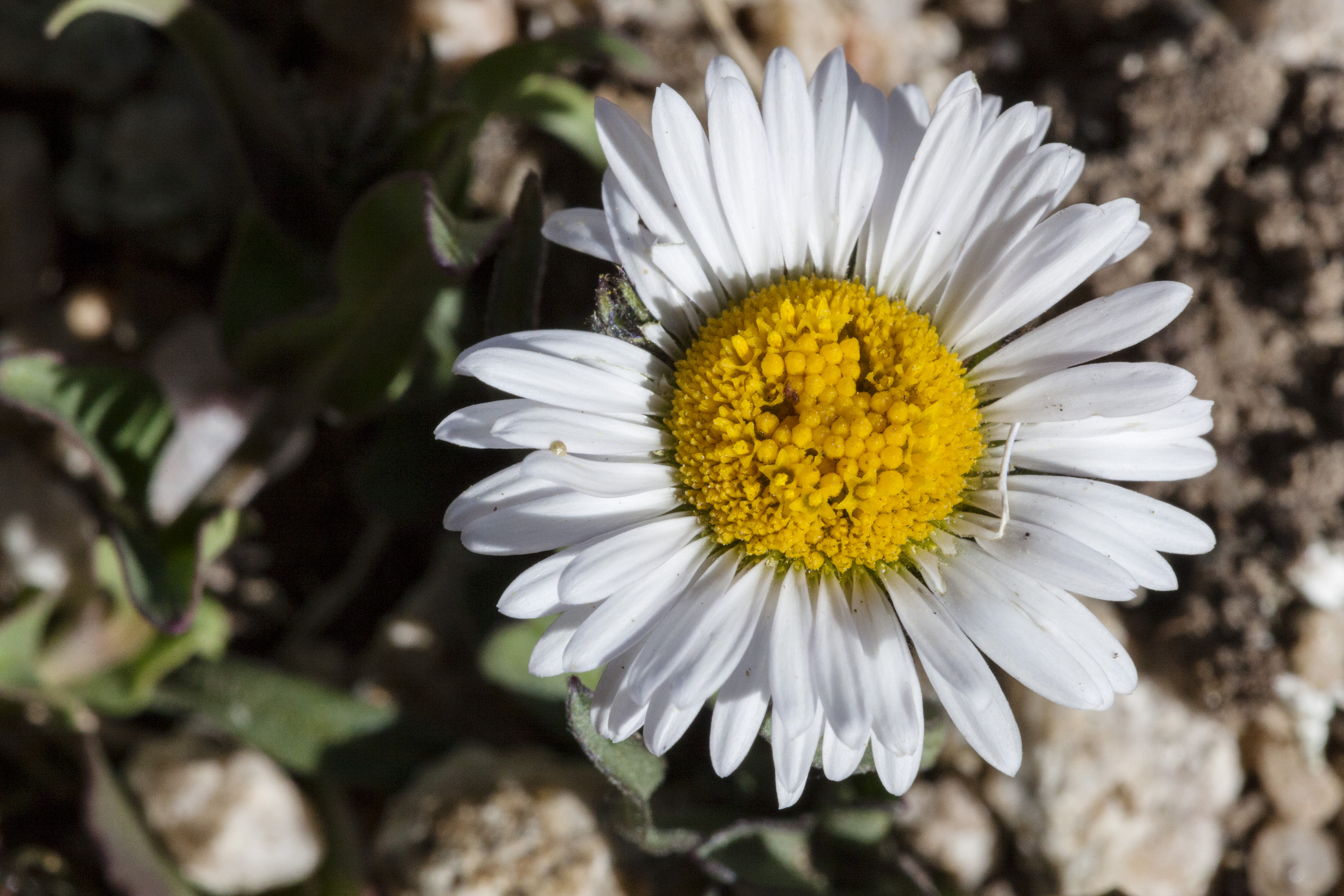
- Erigeron melanocephalus in the Sangre de Cristo Mountains

Conservation status
- Apparently Secure (NatureServe)

Scientific classification
- Kingdom: Plantae
- Clade: Tracheophytes
- Clade: Angiosperms
- Clade: Eudicots
- Clade: Asterids
- Order: Asterales
- Family: Asteraceae
- Genus: Erigeron
- Species: E. melanocephalus

Binomial name
- Erigeron melanocephalus (A.Nelson) A.Nelson

Synonyms
- Erigeron uniflorus var. melanocephalus A.Nelson

= Erigeron melanocephalus =

Species of flowering plant

Erigeron melanocephalus is a North American species of flowering plant in the family Asteraceae known by the common name black-headed fleabane. It is found in the Rocky Mountains of the western United States, in the states of Wyoming, Colorado, New Mexico, and Utah.

Erigeron melanocephalus is a perennial herb up to 21 centimeters (8.4 inches) tall, spreading by means of underground rhizomes. The leaves are mostly crowded around the base of the stem. The plant generally produces only 1 flower heads per stem, each head with black hairs covering the phyllaries (bracts) covering the base of the head (hence the name black-headed fleabane). Each head also has up to 74 white or purple ray florets surrounding numerous yellow disc florets.
