= The Blackguard =

1925 British-German film by Graham Cutts

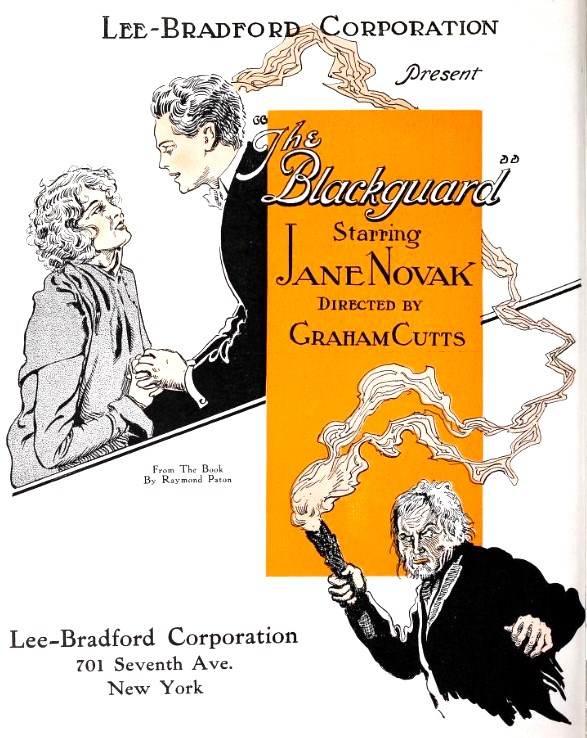
- American advertisement
- Directed by: Graham Cutts
- Written by: Alfred Hitchcock; Adrian Brunel
- Based on: The Blackguard by Raymond Paton
- Produced by: Michael Balcon; Erich Pommer
- Starring: Jane Novak; Walter Rilla; Frank Stanmore; Bernhard Goetzke
- Cinematography: Theodor Sparkuhl
- Production companies: Gainsborough Pictures; UFA
- Distributed by: Wardour Films (UK)
- Release date: 26 October 1925
- Running time: 1 hour 36 min.
- Countries: United Kingdom; Germany
- Languages: Silent film; English intertitles; German intertitles

The Blackguard (German: Die Prinzessin und der Geiger) is a 1925 British-German silent drama film directed by Graham Cutts and starring Jane Novak, Walter Rilla, and Frank Stanmore. The film is set against the backdrop of the Russian Revolution during which a violinist saves a princess from execution.

== Plot ==
As described in a film magazine review, Michael Caviol, violinist, after he has been hit on the head sees visions in which he is dominated by a god-like creature, Maliol, who promises him success so long as he loves nothing but his art. He becomes famous but shuns the love of woman until he loses his heart to the Russian princess Marie Idourska. The Revolution breaks out, and the princess is threatened with death. Michael finds the leader to be Adrian Levenski, his former music master. He obtains two passports from Levenski and effects Marie's escape. Levenski and Michael fight and the latter is thrown into a flaming building, escaping but being badly burned in the process. While praying in a church, Marie enters and kneels beside him, now no longer a princess but still his love.

== Cast ==
- Jane Novak as Prinzessin Maria Idourska / Princess Marie Idourska
- Walter Rilla as Michael Caviol, The Blackguard
- Frank Stanmore as Pompouard
- Bernhard Goetzke as Adrian Levinsky
- Rosa Valetti as Grandmother
- Dora Bergner as Duchess
- Fritz Alberti as Painter
- Robert Leffler as Leidner
- Alexander Murski as Vollmark
- Martin Herzberg as Michael Caviol as a boy
- Loni Nest as Prinzessin Maria as little girl
- Robert Scholz as Grandduke Paul

== Production ==
The film was a co-production between Gainsborough Studios and UFA initiating a decade-long series of co-productions which ended with the rise of the Nazi Party in the 1930s. The film was based on the 1923 novel The Blackguard by Raymond Paton, and shot at Studio Babelsberg, in Potsdam near Berlin, the first time a Gainsborough film was shot abroad. The film was one of a number of films made in this genre during the 1920s, the most successful of which was the American film The Student Prince in Old Heidelberg (1927).

While working on the film, Alfred Hitchcock was able to study several films being made nearby, including The Last Laugh (1924) by F. W. Murnau, which were a major influence on his later work.

== Preservation ==
Prints of The Blackguard are located in several film archives and it has been released on dvd.

== Bibliography ==
- Cook, Pam, ed. (1997). Gainsborough Pictures. London: Cassell. ISBN 978-0-304-33708-8.
- Kreimeier, Klaus (1999). The Ufa Story: A History of Germany's Greatest Film Company, 1918–1945. Berkeley: University of California Press. ISBN 978-0-520-22069-0.
