= Black Watch (disambiguation) =

The Black Watch is an infantry battalion of the Royal Regiment of Scotland.

Black Watch may also refer to:

- The Black Watch (Royal Highland Regiment) of Canada
- 42nd Regiment of Foot, the official title of the Black Watch from 1739 to 1881
- Australian 20th Reinforcements, WW I consisting of 30 enlisted Aboriginal stockmen, some serving with 11th Light Horse Regiment
- Black Watch (full rigged ship), a 1877 large sailing ship built in Windsor, Nova Scotia
- MS Black Watch (1971), a cruise ship
- Black Watch (play), a 2006 Scottish play written by Gregory Burke
- The Black Watch (film), a 1929 film directed by John Ford
- Black Watch (wristwatch), made by Sinclair Radionics
- The Black Watch (band), a rock band
- Black Watch, a type of tartan
