= Animals named as black-legged =

A wide variety of animals have names describing them as black-legged.

- Birds:
  - Black-legged kittiwake
  - Black-legged seriema
  - Black-legged dacnis
- Amphibians:
  - Black-legged dart frog
- Invertebrates:
  - Arthropods
    - Insects
      - Blacklegged tick, Ixodes scapularis
      - Black-legged water-snipefly, Atherix marginata
      - Black-legged horsefly, Hybomitra micans
      - Violet black-legged robberfly, Dioctria atricapilla
      - Blackleg tortoiseshell, another name for the large tortoiseshell butterfly
