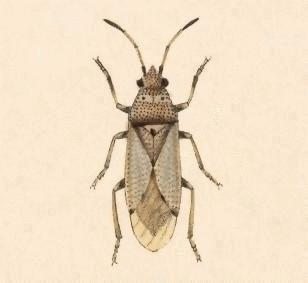
- Cymus guatemalanus

Scientific classification
- Kingdom: Animalia
- Phylum: Arthropoda
- Class: Insecta
- Order: Hemiptera
- Suborder: Heteroptera
- Superfamily: Lygaeoidea
- Family: Cymidae; Baerensprung, 1860

= Cymidae =

Family of true bugs

Cymidae is a family of true bugs in the order Hemiptera. There are at least 60 described species in Cymidae.

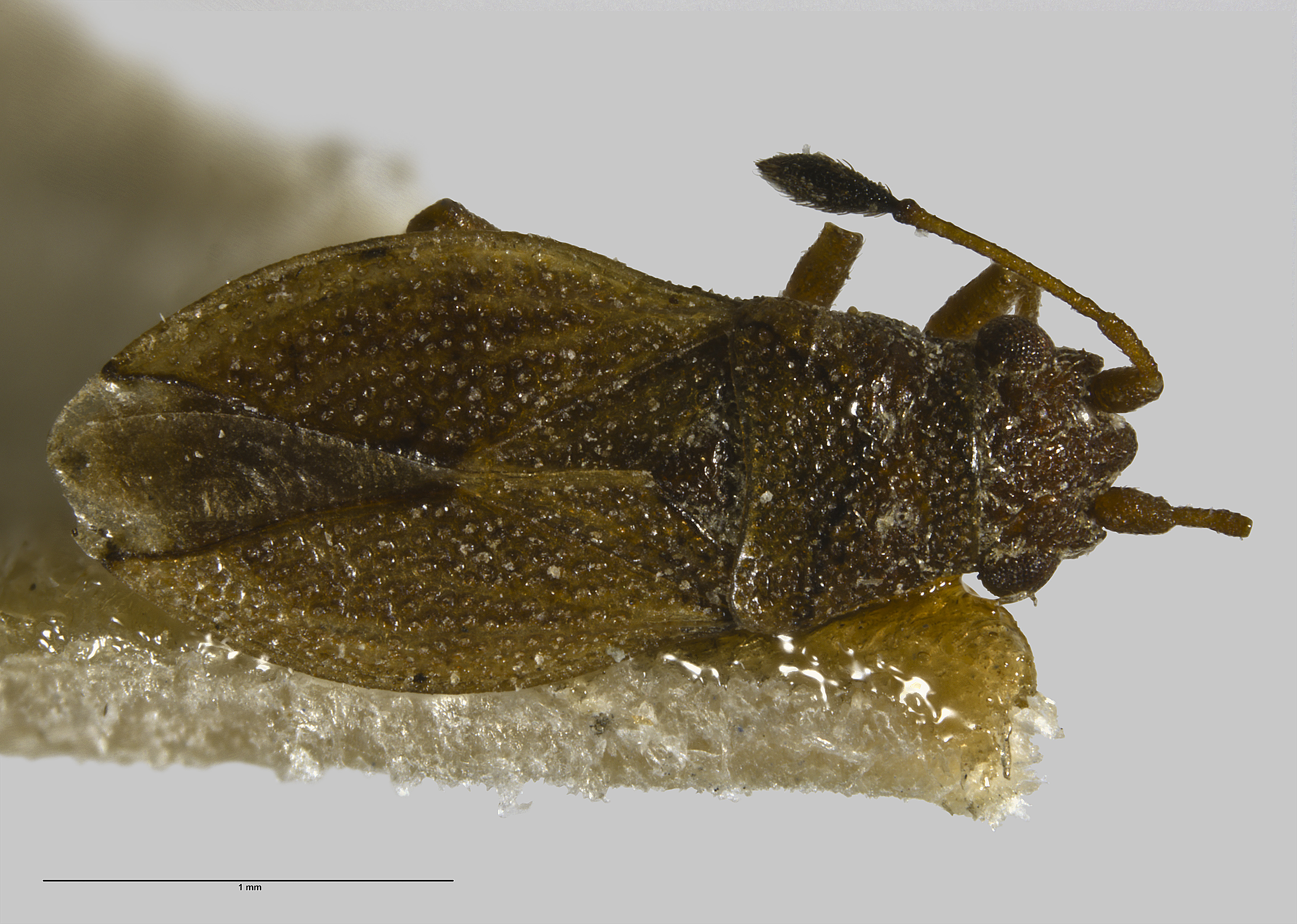
Cymus novaezelandiae

== Genera ==
Genera are placed in two subfamilies:

=== Cyminae ===
Authority: Baerensprung, 1860

1. Ashlockia Hamid, 1975
2. Cymocoris Popov, 1986
3. Cymodema Spinola, 1837
4. Cymus Hahn, 1833
5. Neocymodema Hamid, 1975

=== Ontiscinae ===
Authority: Hamid, 1975

1. Neocymus Van Duzee, 1932
2. Nesocymus Kirkaldy, 1907
3. Ontiscus Stal, 1874
4. Pseudocymus Van Duzee, 1936
5. Sephora Kirkaldy, 1902

Incertae sedis

1. † Cephalocoris Heer, 1853
2. † Procymus Usinger, 1940
