= Honeycreeper (disambiguation) =

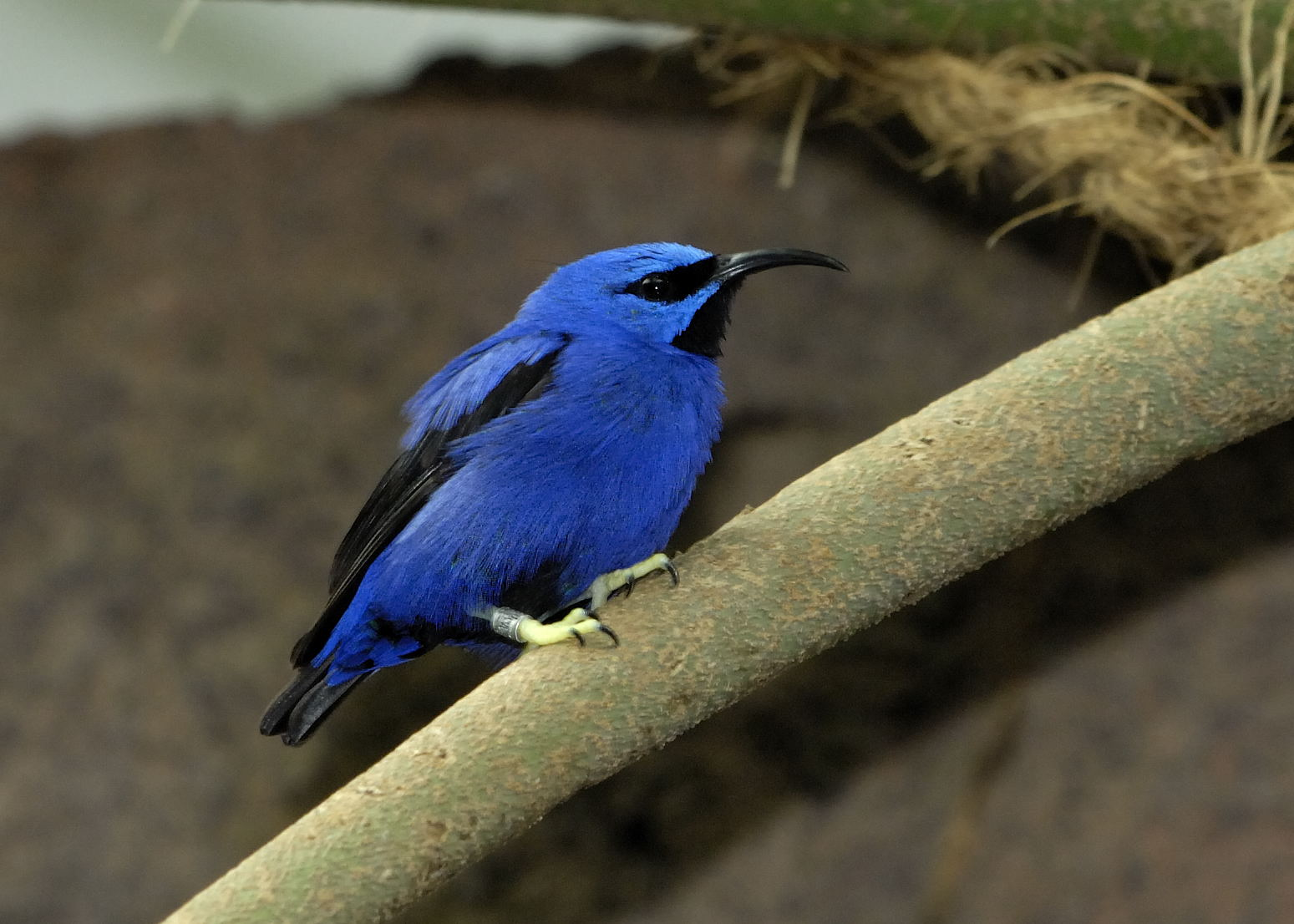
Males of typical honeycreepers (like this purple honeycreeper) are blue and black.

Honeycreeper is a term for several sorts of songbirds:

- The "true honeycreepers" are three genera in the tanager family.
  - Cyanerpes, four species of typical honeycreepers
  - Chlorophanes, the green honeycreeper
  - Iridophanes, the golden-collared honeycreeper
- Hawaiian honeycreepers, a group of birds in the finch family

Honeycreeper may also refer to:

- Honeycreeper (album), an album by Japanese pop band Puffy AmiYumi
