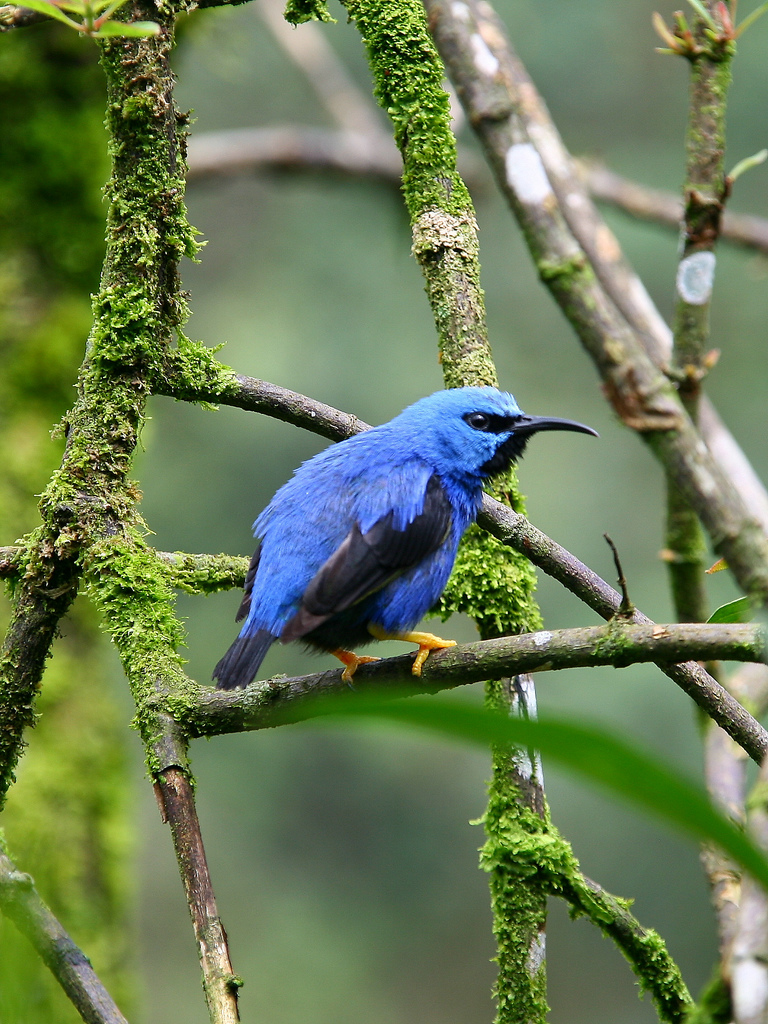
- Male
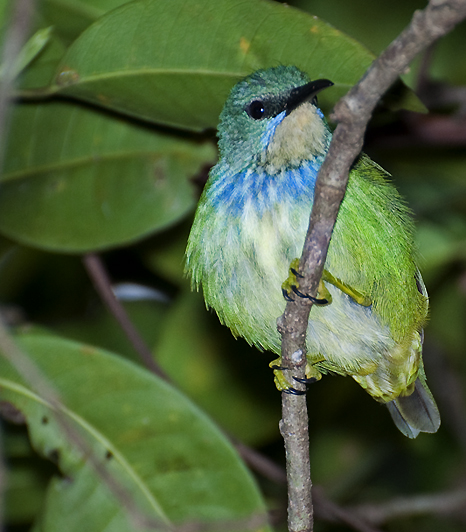
- Female

Conservation status
- Least Concern (IUCN 3.1)

Scientific classification
- Kingdom: Animalia
- Phylum: Chordata
- Class: Aves
- Order: Passeriformes
- Family: Thraupidae
- Genus: Cyanerpes
- Species: C. lucidus

Binomial name
- Cyanerpes lucidus (Sclater, PL & Salvin, 1859)

= Shining honeycreeper =

Species of bird

The shining honeycreeper (Cyanerpes lucidus) is a species of bird in the family Thraupidae, the tanagers and allies. It is found in Mexico, every Central American country except El Salvador, and Colombia.

== Taxonomy and systematics ==
The shining honeycreeper was formally described in 1859 with the binomial Coereba lucida, as a member of a genus now occupied solely by the bananaquit (C. flaveola). It now shares genus Cyanerpes with three other species. Some early twentieth century authors considered it and the purple honeycreeper (C. caeruleus) to be conspecific but they are sympatric in Panama and Colombia.

The shining honeycreeper has two subspecies, the nominate C. l. lucidus (Sclater, PL & Salvin, 1859) and C. l. isthmicus (Bangs, 1907).

== Description ==
The shining honeycreeper is 10 to 11 cm (3.9 to 4.3 in) long and weighs an average of about 11 g (0.39 oz). It has a slender, decurved, longish bill and a short tail. The species is sexually dimorphic. Adult males of the nominate subspecies are mostly ultramarine blue. They have a lighter, more azure head with a small black mask from the lores to just past the eye, a black throat and upper breast, and black wings and tail. Adult females have a mostly grass-green head with a grayish blue or greenish crown and nape with some thin white stripes on the forecrown, brownish dusky lores, and a blue malar stripe. Their upperparts, wings, and tail are dull grass green. Their chin and throat are buff. Their breast, sides, flanks, belly, and undertail coverts are grayish green with blue streaks on the breast. Their underwing coverts are dull yellow. Subspecies C. l. isthmicus is smaller than the nominate and has a thinner and shorter bill. The male's overall blue is darker than the nominate's with a significantly lighter blue head. Females have duller green upperparts and a less bluish crown and nape than the nominate. Both sexes of both subspecies have a dark brown iris and a black bill. Males' legs and feet are bright yellow and females' yellowish green or light green with a thin yellow line down the back of the leg.

== Distribution and habitat ==
The shining honeycreeper has a disjunct distribution that is not shown on the map. The nominate subspecies is the more northerly of the two and has a somewhat larger range. It is found from eastern Chiapas in southern Mexico south on the Caribbean slope through Belize, Guatemala, and Honduras into northern Nicaragua. It occurs very spottily rather than continuously in Belize, Guatemala, and Honduras. Subspecies C. l. isthmicus is found on the Caribbean slope from far southern Nicaragua through Costa Rica and western Panama and from there across all of Panama into extreme northwestern Colombia's Chocó Department. It separately occurs on the Pacific slope from central Puntarenas and western San José provinces in Costa Rica into western Panama. The species inhabits the interior and edges of evergreen forest and secondary forest in the lowlands of the tropical and lower subtropical zones. Overall it ranges in elevation from sea level to 1,500 m (4,900 ft) but reaches only 1,200 m (3,900 ft) in Costa Rica and 100 m (300 ft) in Colombia.

== Behavior ==
=== Movement ===
The shining honeycreeper is a year-round resident.

=== Feeding ===
The shining honeycreeper feeds on fruit, insects, and nectar. It forages mostly in the forest canopy, usually in pairs and often as part of a mixed-species feeding flock. It takes most insect prey by gleaning from foliage and twigs but also takes it in mid-air with a sally from a perch.

=== Breeding ===
The shining honeycreeper's breeding season has not been defined. However, breeding-related activity has been observed in January, June, and October. Its nest is a shallow, thin cup made from plant fibers attached to horizontal twigs, and apparently the female alone builds it. The clutch is two dark eggs; the female incubates for 12 to 13 days. Fledging occurs about 13 to 14 days after hatch and both parents provision nestlings.

=== Vocalization ===
What is thought to be the shining honeycreeper's song is "a single note, repeated at a rate of about 1 note per second for about 15 minutes". Its call has been described as a "high-pitched tseeeet!". Other calls include ""a high, thin tzit, a thin, drier tsip, and a slightly rattling tsrrrp" and "high, sharp, staccato chittering notes and a little chatter, also a very high thin seee seee seee seeuu".

== Status ==
The IUCN has assessed the shining honeycreeper as being of Least Concern. It has a large range; its population size is not known but is believed to be stable. No immediate threats have been identified. It is considered "rare to uncommon" in northern Central America, "fairly common" in Costa Rica, and "local" in Colombia.
