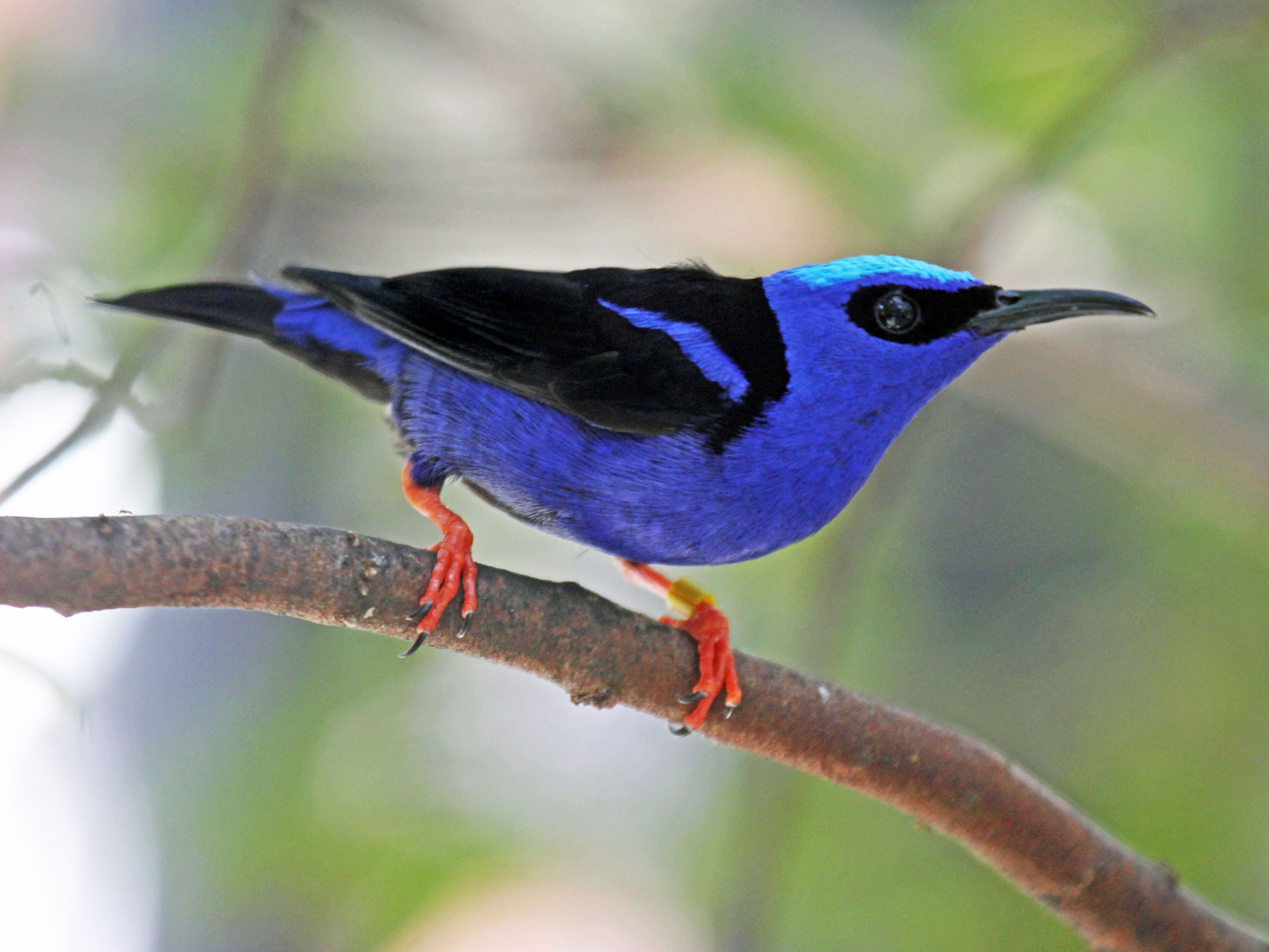
- male red-legged honeycreeper.

Scientific classification
- Kingdom: Animalia
- Phylum: Chordata
- Class: Aves
- Order: Passeriformes
- Family: Thraupidae
- Genus: Cyanerpes; Oberholser, 1899

Type species
- Certhia cyanea Linnaeus, 1766

= Honeycreeper =

Genus of birds

The true honeycreepers form a genus Cyanerpes of small birds in the tanager family Thraupidae. They are found in the tropical New World from Mexico south to Brazil. They occur in the forest canopy, and, as the name implies, they are specialist nectar feeders with long curved bills.

The four Cyanerpes species have colourful legs, long wings and a short tail. The males are typically glossy purple-blue and the females greenish.

== Taxonomy and species list ==
The genus Cyanerpes was introduced in 1899 by the American ornithologist Harry C. Oberholser with the red-legged honeycreeper as the type species. The name combines the Ancient Greek κῠ́ᾰνος (kŭ́ănos) meaning "dark-blue" and ἕρπης (herpēs) meaning "creeper".

There are two other tanagers with honeycreeper in their common name: the green honeycreeper in the monospecific genus Chlorophanes and the golden-collared honeycreeper in the monospecific genus Iridophanes. These two species are sister taxa and belong to the subfamily Hemithraupinae rather than to Dacninae with the members of Cyanerpes.

The genus contains the following four species:

Genus Cyanerpes – Oberholser, 1899 – four species
Common name	Scientific name and subspecies	Range	Size and ecology	IUCN status and estimated population
Short-billed honeycreeper Male Female	Cyanerpes nitidus (Hartlaub, 1847)	Bolivia, Brazil, Colombia, Ecuador, Peru, Suriname, and Venezuela	Size: Habitat: Diet:	LC
Shining honeycreeper Male Female	Cyanerpes lucidus (Sclater, PL & Salvin, 1859)	Mexico to Panama and northwest Colombia	Size: Habitat: Diet:	LC
Purple honeycreeper Male Female	Cyanerpes caeruleus (Linnaeus, 1758) Five subspecies: C. c. chocoanus Hellmayr, 1920; C. c. caeruleus (Linnaeus, 1758); C. c. hellmayri Gyldenstolpe, 1945; C. c. longirostris (Cabanis, 1851) – Trinidad; C. c. microrhynchus (Berlepsch, 1884)	Colombia and Venezuela south to Brazil, and on Trinidad.	Size: Habitat: Diet:	LC
Red-legged honeycreeper Male Female	Cyanerpes cyaneus (Linnaeus, 1766) Eleven subspecies: C. c. carneipes (Sclater, PL, 1860); C. c. pacificus Chapman, 1915; C. c. gigas Thayer & Bangs, 1905; C. c. gemmeus Wetmore, 1941; C. c. eximius (Cabanis, 1851); C. c. tobagensis Hellmayr & Seilern, 1914; C. c. cyaneus (Linnaeus, 1766); C. c. dispar Zimmer, JT, 1942; C. c. violaceus Zimmer, JT, 1942; C. c. brevipes (Cabanis, 1851); C. c. holti Parkes, 1977	southern Mexico south to Peru, Bolivia and central Brazil, Trinidad and Tobago, and on Cuba	Size: Habitat: Diet:	LC

== Eggs ==
A commonly repeated, yet false, belief about the various honeycreeper species is that some of them lay black eggs. This idea was first made known in the scientific community with the 1899 publication of Nehrkorn's egg catalog; Nehrkorn's claim was cited in ornithological literature for many years without verification, but by the 1940s it was established that none of the members of Cyanerpes lay such eggs.

== See also ==
- Hawaiian honeycreeper
