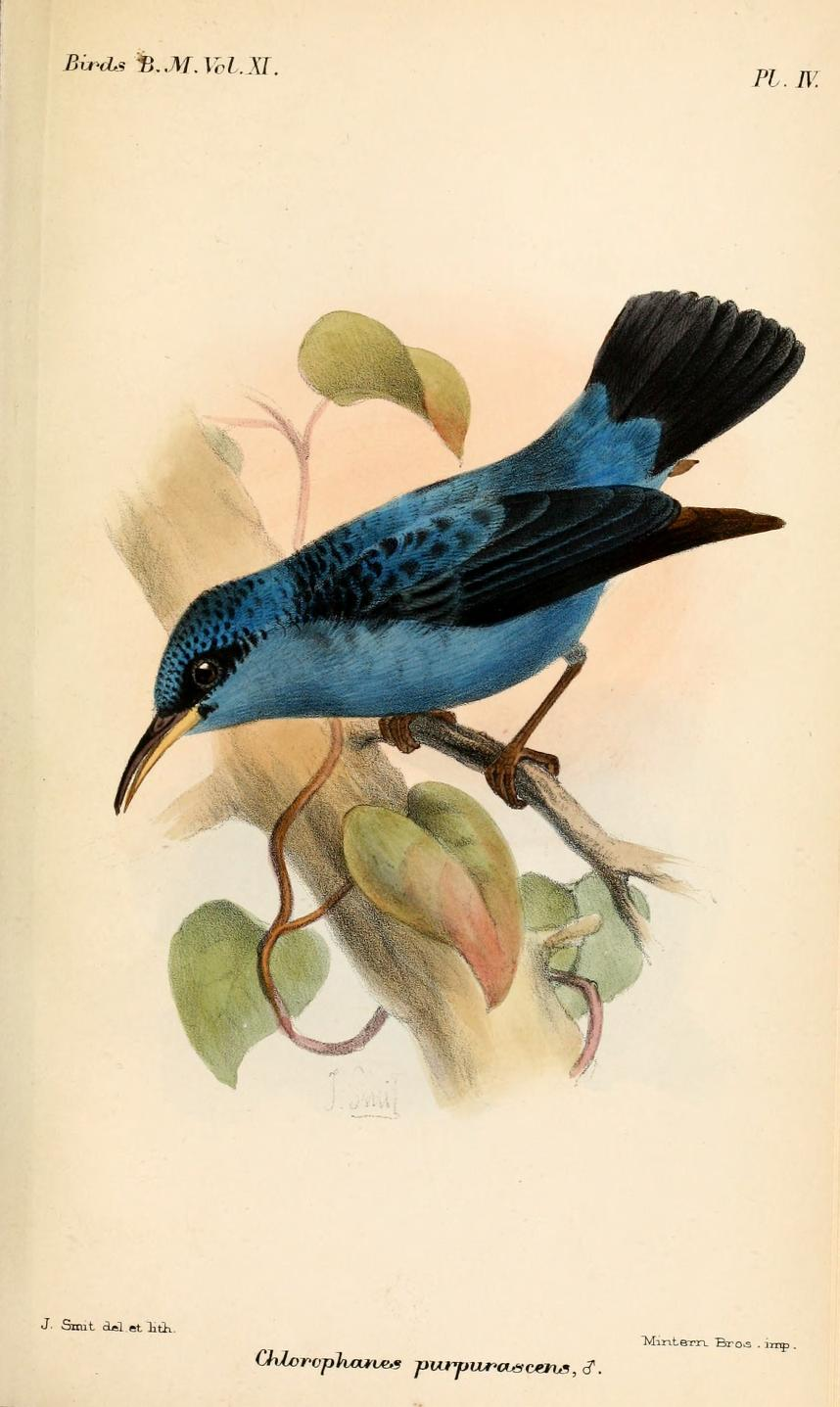
- Purplish honeycreeper, illustration by Joseph Smit, 1886

Scientific classification
- Kingdom: Animalia
- Phylum: Chordata
- Class: Aves
- Order: Passeriformes
- Family: Thraupidae
- Genus: Chlorophanes
- Species: C. purpurascens

Binomial name
- Chlorophanes purpurascens Sclater & Salvin, 1873

= Purplish honeycreeper =

Species of bird

The purplish honeycreeper (Chlorophanes purpurascens) is a bird in the Thraupidae, or tanager family. It is known only from the type specimen, a trade-skin held in the British Museum, and is thought to be an intergeneric hybrid between the green honeycreeper (Chlorophanes spiza) and either the red-legged honeycreeper (Cyanerpes cyaneus) or the blue dacnis (Dacnis cayana), though Hellmayr, in his Catalogue of birds of the Americas and the adjacent islands, considered it a good species.

The type locality on the specimen's label was given as Caracas in Venezuela. However Storer, when discussing the specimen and the characteristics of its preparation, suggested that it was more likely to derive from the Paria Peninsula of northern Venezuela.

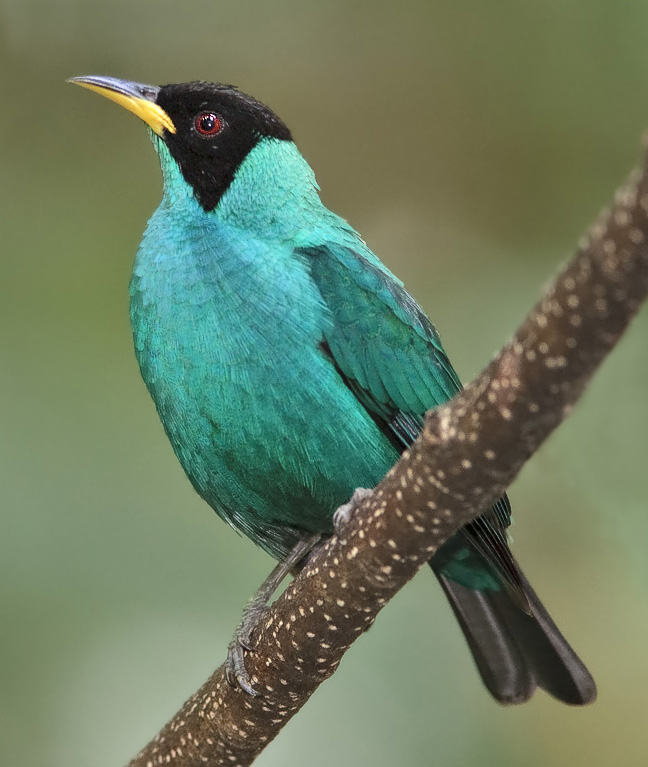
Male green honeycreeper

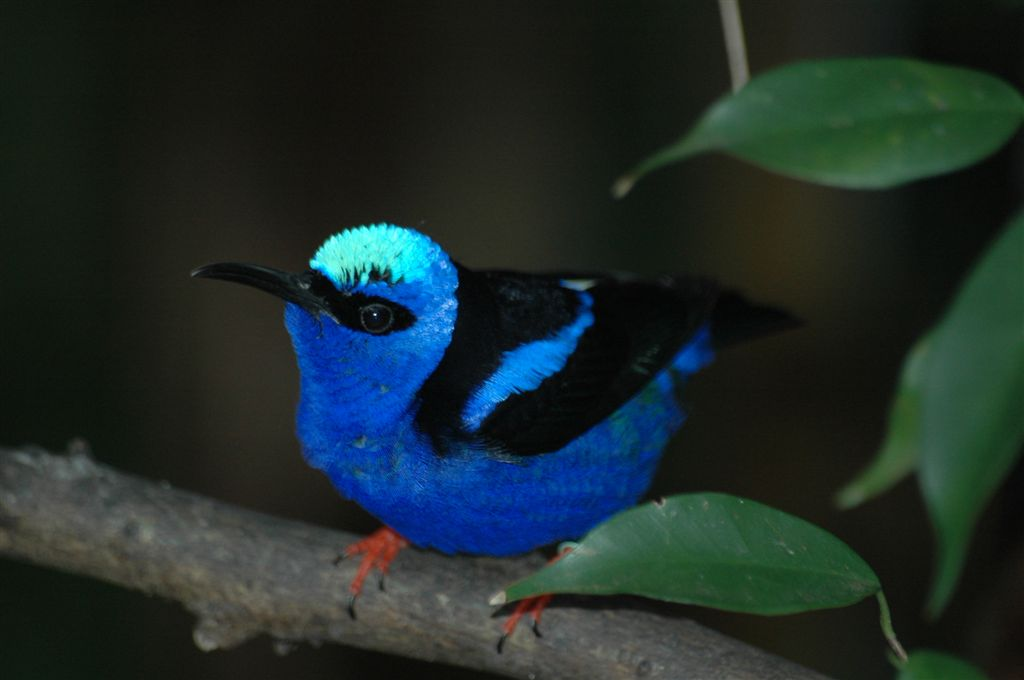
Male red-legged honeycreeper

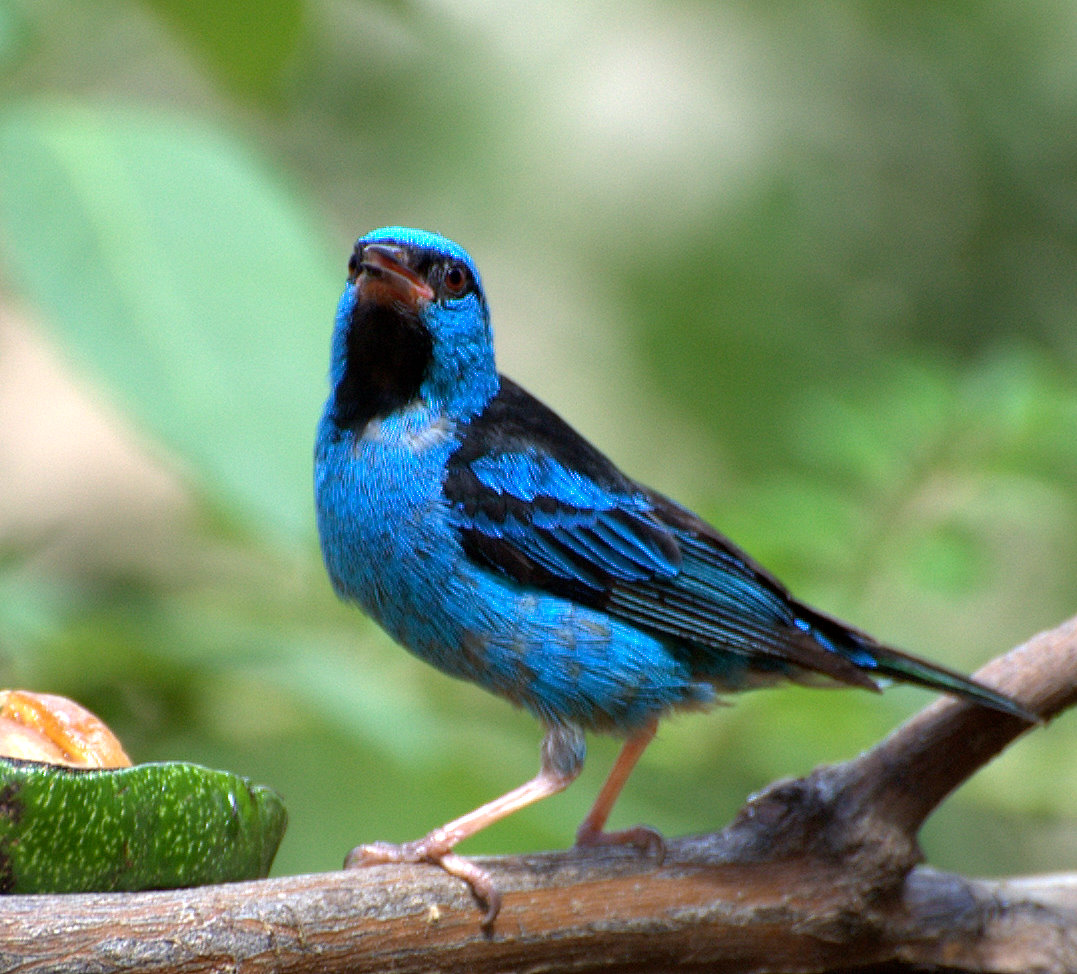
Male blue dacnis
