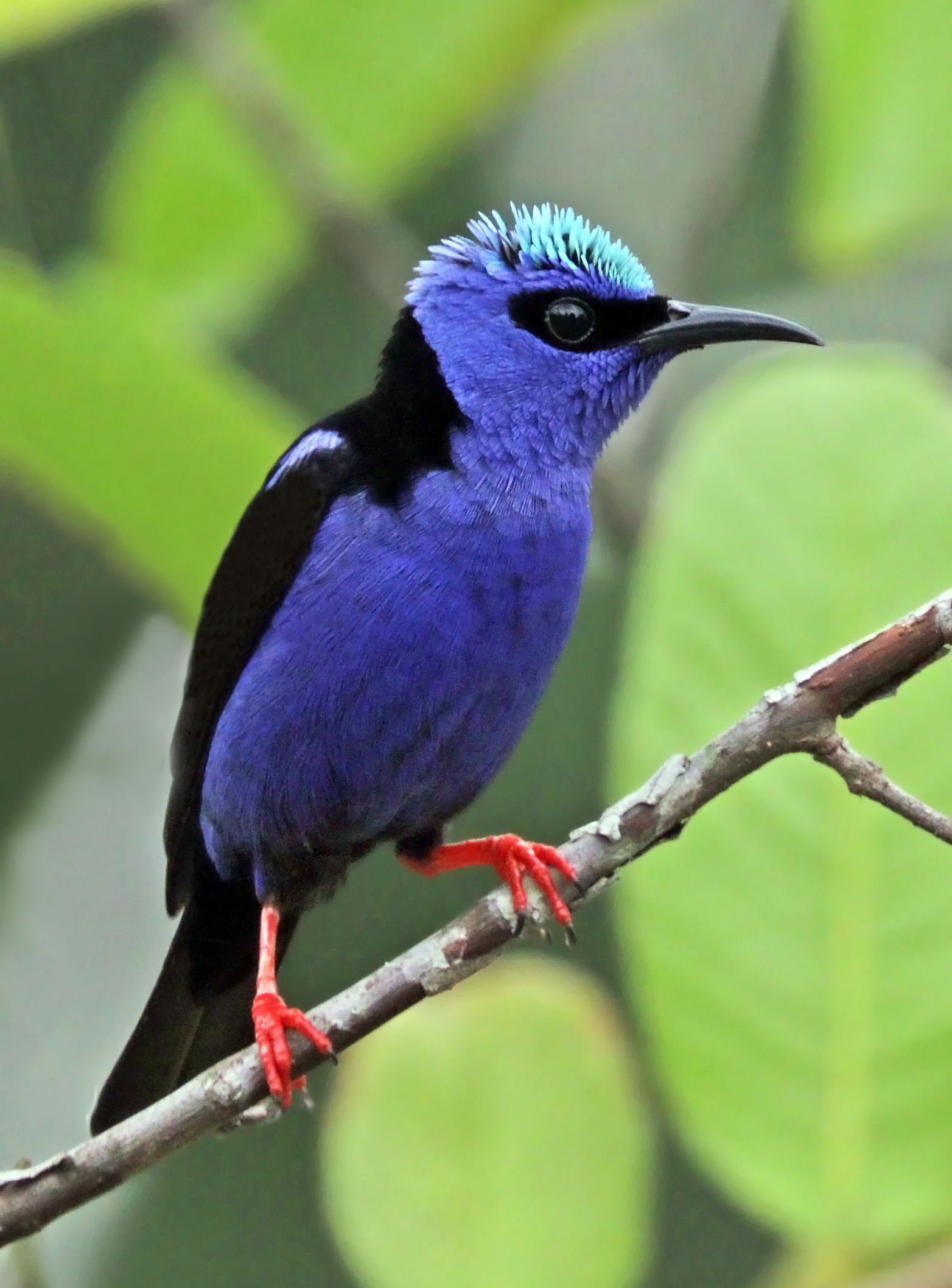
- Adult male, Panama
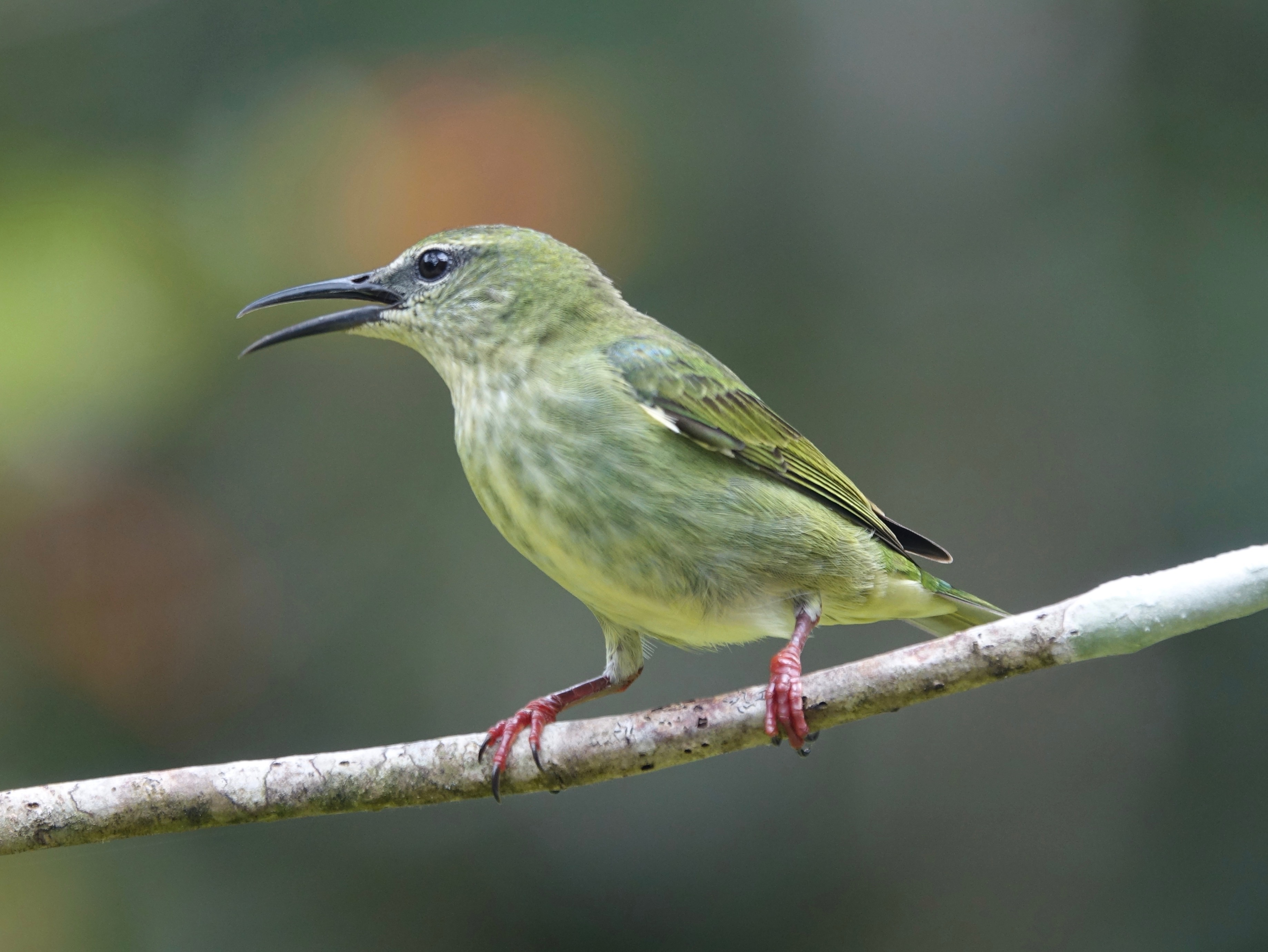
- Female

Conservation status
- Least Concern (IUCN 3.1)

Scientific classification
- Kingdom: Animalia
- Phylum: Chordata
- Class: Aves
- Order: Passeriformes
- Family: Thraupidae
- Genus: Cyanerpes
- Species: C. cyaneus

Binomial name
- Cyanerpes cyaneus (Linnaeus, 1766)
- Year-round Year-round (origin uncertain) Non-breeding Breeding

Synonyms
- Certhia cyanea Linnaeus, 1766

= Red-legged honeycreeper =

Species of bird

The red-legged honeycreeper (Cyanerpes cyaneus) is a small songbird in the family Thraupidae, the tanagers and allies. It is regularly found in Mexico, every Central American country, Trinidad and Tobago, and every mainland South American country except Argentina, Chile, Paraguay, and Uruguay. It has also occurred as a vagrant in the United States, Argentina, and some southern Caribbean islands.

== Taxonomy and systematics ==
The red-legged honeycreeper was formally described by the Swedish naturalist Carl Linnaeus in 1766 in the twelfth edition of his Systema Naturae with the binomial Certhia cyanea. Linnaeus based his description on "The Black and Blue Creeper" that had been described and illustrated in 1760 by the English naturalist George Edwards from a specimen collected in Suriname. The purple honeycreeper was named the type species of the genus Cyanerpes when the American ornithologist Harry C. Oberholser erected the genus in 1899. The specific epithet cyaneus is a Latin word meaning "dark-blue".

The purplish honeycreeper (Chlorophanes purpurascens), a bird from Venezuela known only from the type specimen, is considered to be an intergeneric hybrid between the green honeycreeper (Chlorophanes spiza) and either the red-legged honeycreeper or the blue dacnis (Dacnis cayana).

The red-legged honeycreeper has these 11 subspecies:

- C. c. carneipes (Sclater, PL, 1860)
- C. c. pacificus Chapman, 1915
- C. c. gigas Thayer & Bangs, 1905
- C. c. gemmeus Wetmore, 1941
- C. c. eximius (Cabanis, 1851)
- C. c. tobagensis Hellmayr & Seilern, 1914
- C. c. cyaneus (Linnaeus, 1766)
- C. c. dispar Zimmer, JT, 1942
- C. c. violaceus Zimmer, JT, 1942
- C. c. brevipes (Cabanis, 1851)
- C. c. holti Parkes, 1977

== Description ==
The red-legged honeycreeper is 11 to 13 cm (4.3 to 5.1 in) long and weighs 11 to 18 g (0.39 to 0.63 oz). It has slender decurved bill. The species is sexually dimorphic. Adult males of the nominate subspecies C. c. cyaneus in breeding plumage are mostly bright purplish blue. They have a shaggy azure-blue crown. They have a small black mask from the lores to just past the eye, a large triangular black patch on the nape and mantle, and a black tail. Their upperwing coverts and the upper side of their flight feathers are black; their underwing coverts and the flight feathers' undersides are bright yellow. Adult females have a dull olive-green crown, nape, and upperparts. They have a faint whitish supercilium and dusky green lores whose color continues as a thin line through the eye on an otherwise light yellow face with thin greenish and dusky streaks. Their upperwing coverts, flight feathers, and tail are dusky with olive-green edges. Their throat is grayish white, their breast and belly light yellow with faint thin greenish streaks, and their undertail coverts light yellow. Males in non-breeding plumage retain their wings' and tail's breeding colors but are otherwise like adult females. Both sexes of all subspecies have a dark brown iris and a blackish bill. Males' legs and feet are bright red and females' usually dull reddish but brighter when breeding.

The other subspecies of the red-legged honeycreeper differ from the nominate and each other thus:

- C. c. carneipes: male has smaller area of azure on the crown; female is more yellowish on the throat and center of breast and belly
- C. c. pacificus: male's crown patch is smaller and darker blue and underwing is paler yellow
- C. c. gigas: male is darker and more purplish overall with crown patch and underwing like those of pacificus
- C. c. gemmeus: largest subspecies with heaviest bill; male has darker blue crown; female has grayish green upperparts
- C. c. eximius: longer, more decurved bill; male's crown patch is paler and larger
- C. c. tobagensis: larger with longer wings and tail and heavier less decurved bill; female has darker and less yellowish underparts with stronger green streaks
- C. c. dispar: shorter and thicker bill; male's pale blue of crown gradually becomes darker on nape
- C. c. violaceus: longer wings and tail and shorter bill; male's overall blue is more violaceous; female's flight feathers have yellowish edges
- C. c. brevipes: smaller but otherwise like nominate
- C. c. holti: male has smaller crown patch and darker, more intense, underparts

== Distribution and habitat ==
The subspecies of the red-legged honeycreeper are found thus:

- C. c. carneipes: Gulf-Caribbean slope from San Luis Potosí in east-central Mexico south through Belize, Guatemala, and Honduras into Nicaragua; Pacific slope from Oaxaca in southern Mexico south through Guatemala, El Salvador, Honduras, Nicaragua, and Costa Rica; along both slopes of Panama and into the upper Sinú River valley in northwestern Colombia's Córdoba Department; Mexico's Cozumel Island and Panama's Coiba and Pearl islands
- C. c. pacificus: Pacific slope from central Chocó Department in Colombia south into northwestern Ecuador to northern Manabí Province
- C. c. gigas: Gorgona Island off western Colombia
- C. c. gemmeus: northern Colombia's Guajira Peninsula
- C. c. eximius: northern Colombia's Santa Marta region; Serranía del Perijá on the Colombia-Venezuela border; western Zulia, central Falcón, and Yaracuy in northwestern Venezuela; intermittently on both slopes of Venezuelan Andes; Venezuelan Coastal Ranges from Carabobo to Sucre; Venezuela's Margarita Island
- C. c. tobagensis: Tobago
- C. c. cyaneus: Trinidad; from Venezuela's Monagas, Delta Amacuro and Bolívar states east through the Guianas and northern Brazil from the Negro River east to the Atlantic in Pará
- C. c. dispar: southeastern third of Colombia and southern Venezuela's Amazonas state south through northwestern Brazil east to the Negro and Juruá rivers and eastern Peru to Ucayali Department; scattered records in eastern Ecuador
- C. c. violaceus: southeastern Peru, northern Bolivia, and east into western Brazil's Mato Grosso
- C. c. brevipes: middle and lower Amazon Basin in Brazil from the Manaus area east to the Tocantins River
- C. c. holti: coastal eastern Brazil from Alagoas south to Rio de Janeiro state

The species has also occurred as a vagrant in the U.S. states of Texas, Louisiana, and Florida and in South America in Argentina, Bonaire, and Curaçao. It is also present on Cuba and Jamaica but probably from escaped or released caged birds.

The red-legged honeycreeper inhabits a wide variety of somewhat open landscapes including the edges of extensive forest, mature secondary forest, clearings with large trees, shaded coffee and cacao plantations, gallery forest, savanna woodlands, and parks and gardens with trees. It occurs less frequently in extensive forest, usually in the crowns of flowering trees. In elevation it reaches 1,750 m (5,700 ft) in northern Central America, 1,200 m (3,900 ft) in Costa Rica and Colombia, 300 m (1,000 ft) in Ecuador, and 2,000 m (6,600 ft) in Brazil. In Venezuela it reaches 1,500 m (4,900 ft) north of the Orinoco River and 2,000 m (6,600 ft) south of it.

== Behavior ==
=== Movement ===
The red-legged honeycreeper is a year-round resident in most of its range. However, much of the populations in all but southernmost Mexico move south after the breeding season. It apparently also makes local elevational movements in other parts of its range. These movements' extent and timing are not well understood. It is found on the Pacific side of Honduras and in southern Peru mostly in the non-breeding season.

=== Feeding ===
The red-legged honeycreeper feeds primarily on fruits and arthropods and on lesser amounts of nectar. In a study on Trinidad, about a third of the species' diet was Miconia berries. It forages in pairs during the breeding season and outside it often in groups of up to about 15 individuals. It regularly joins mixed-species feeding flocks. It forages mostly in the forest's middle to upper levels, hyperactively hopping, flying back and forth, and flicking its wings. It takes much of its insect prey by gleaning from leaves and branches, sometimes hanging upside down to reach them. It also regularly takes prey in mid-air with sallies from a perch. In the Trinidad study it took 40% of its insect prey in the air. In addition to taking fruit from trees and vines, it regularly visits feeders and is known to take it from restaurant tables.

=== Breeding ===
The red-legged honeycreeper's breeding seasons vary geographically but have not been fully defined. They include May in Mexico, February to June in Costa Rica, February in Panama, probably March to June in Trinidad, and at least September to December in Brazil. Its nest is a shallow cup woven from rootlets and other plant fibers with spider web included. It typically is in a branch fork and well hidden in foliage. Its height above ground averages about 5 m (16 ft) with nests known between 2 and 14 m (7 and 46 ft) up. The clutch is usually two eggs though three is known; they are white to bluish with brown speckles. In a study in Costa Rica, the female alone incubated for 12 to 13 days. Fledging occurred about 14 days after hatch and both parents provisioned the nestlings.

=== Vocalization ===
The red-legged honeycreeper calls almost constantly; most of its calls are described as buzzy or lispy. They include "a thin, whiny chee'eeez", a "high, thin, piercing tseet and [a] thin, weak, nasal chaa," and "a lisping, rising, trilled dzrrreet and a high, descending tseew". Its dawn song is rarely heard, "a weak tsip tsip chaa, tsip tsip chaa, repeated over and over".

== Status ==
The IUCN has assessed the red-legged honeycreeper as being of Least Concern. It has an extremely large range; its estimated population of at least five million mature individuals is believed to be stable. No immediate threats have been identified. In northern Central America it is considered "common on both slopes but absent or transient in parts of the interior". It is common in Costa Rica, "common in the west [and] rather local and seasonal elsewhere" in Colombia, "uncommon and local" in Ecuador, "locally or seasonally common" in Venezuela, and "frequent to uncommon" in Brazil. In Peru it is "widely distributed, and locally fairly common...but absent or very rare at many sites (especially in [the] south)". It occurs in a very large number of protected areas. It occurs "widely across most of Amazonian Basin in both protected and unprotected areas, almost none of which is at risk. Isolated Atlantic coastal population is restricted, in large measure, to protected areas".

== Gallery ==
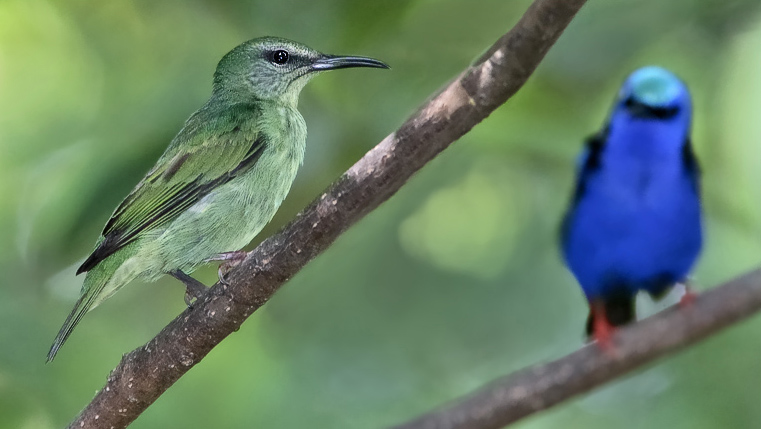
Female (foreground) and male

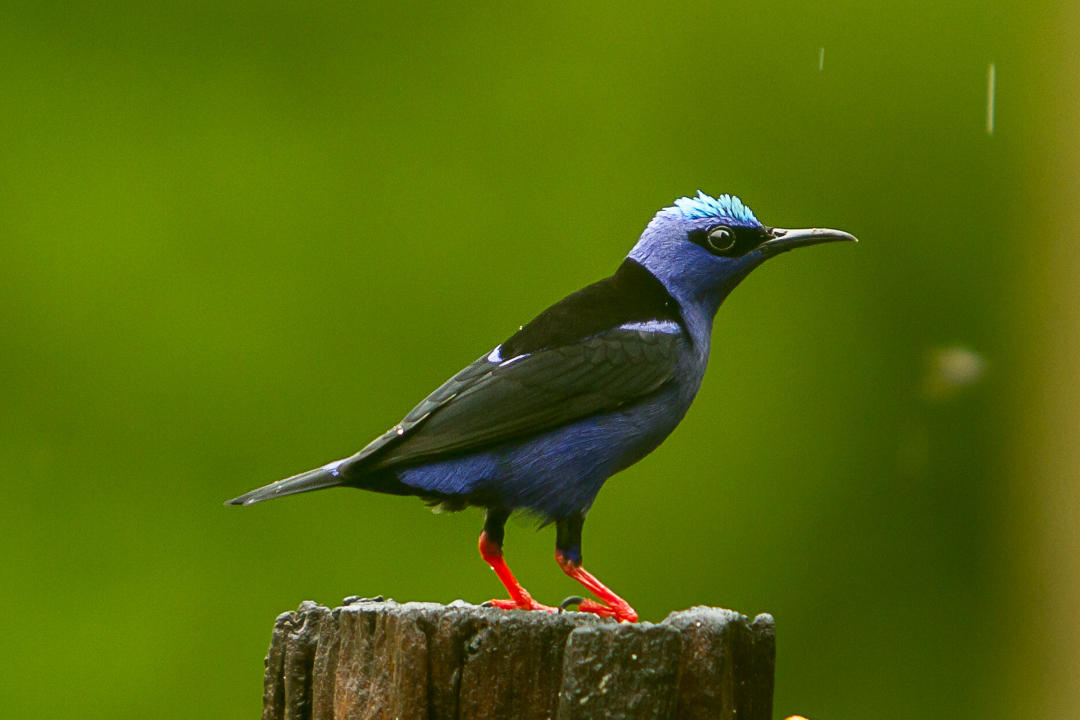
In Chocó Department, Colombia

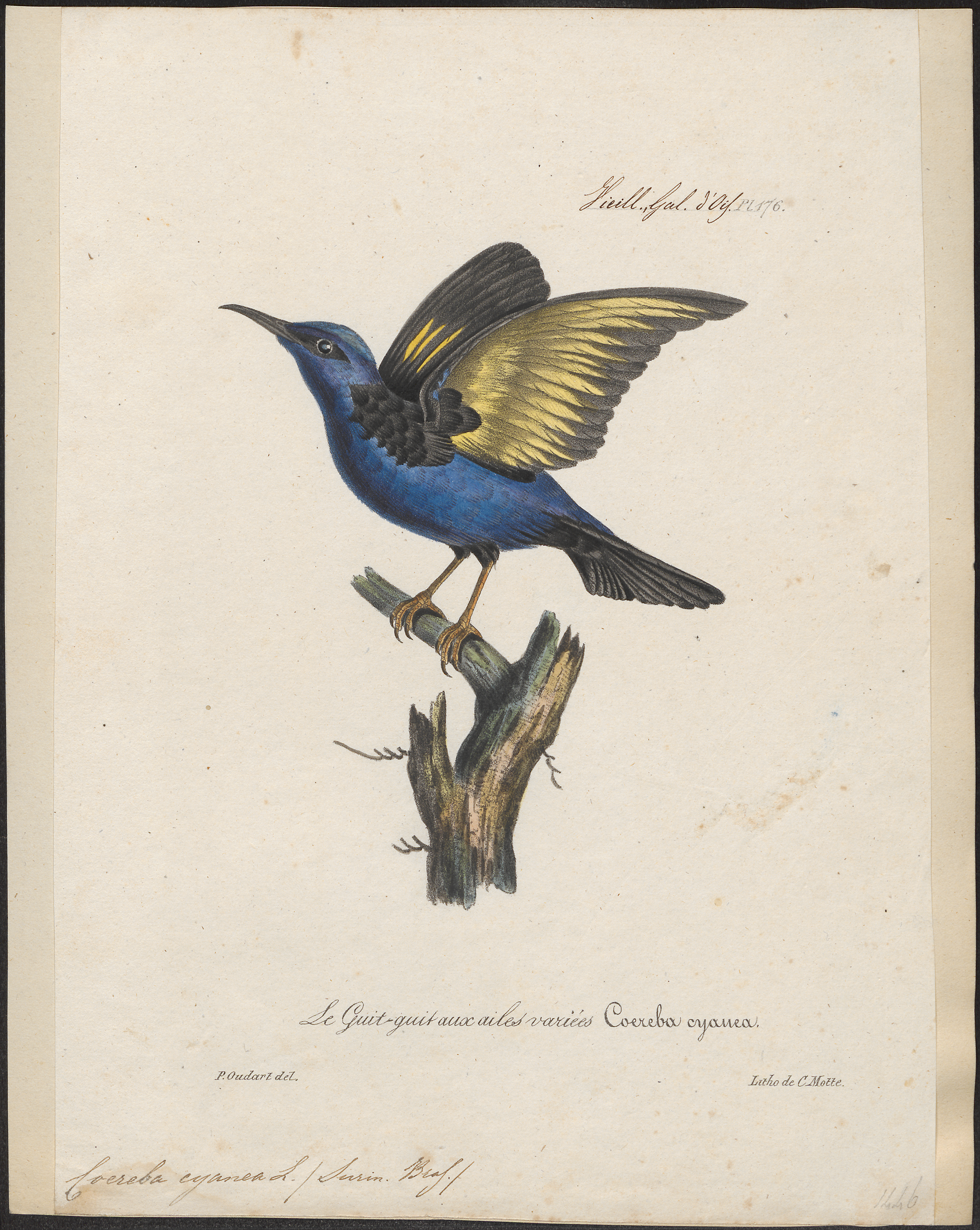
Illustration
