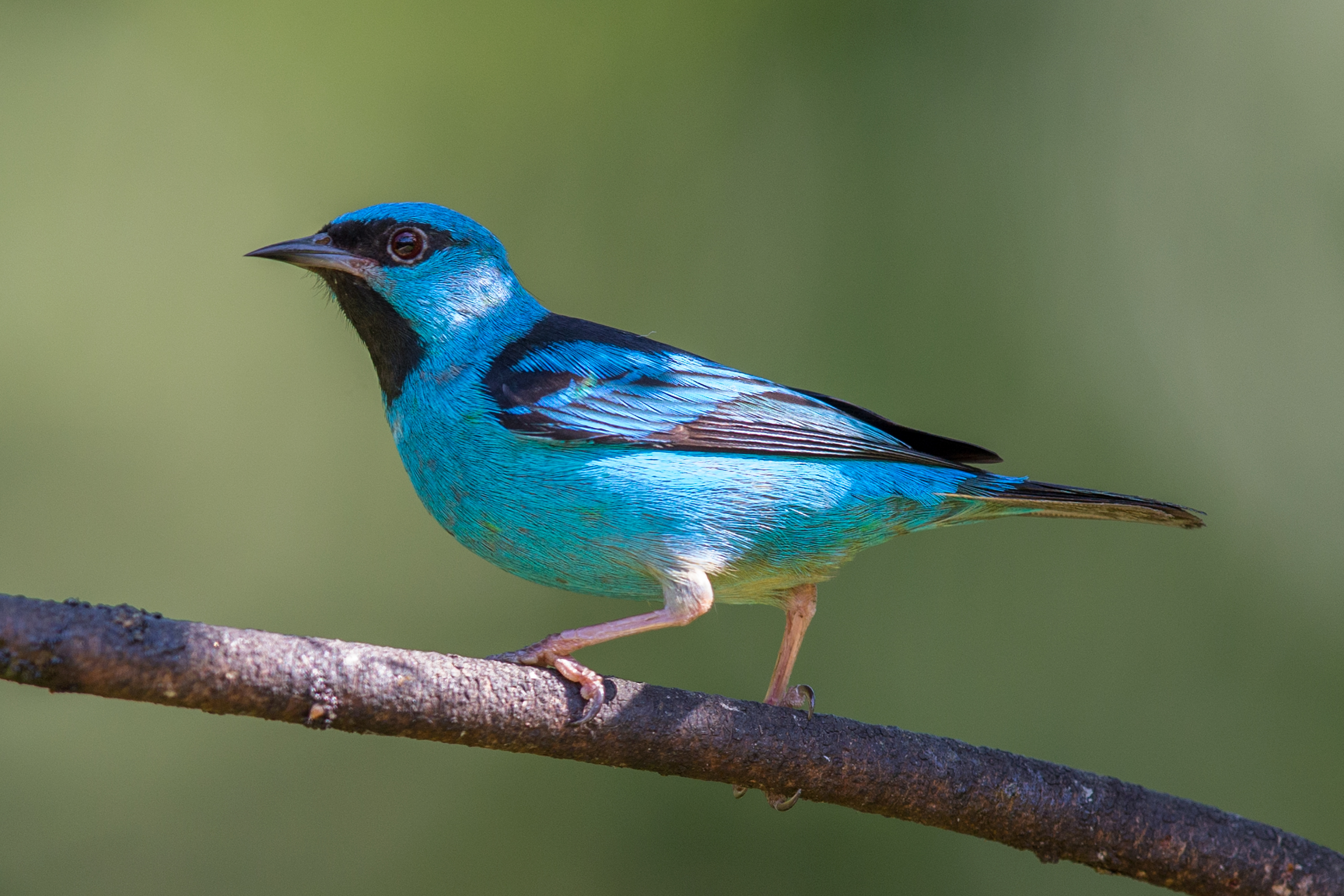
- Adult male
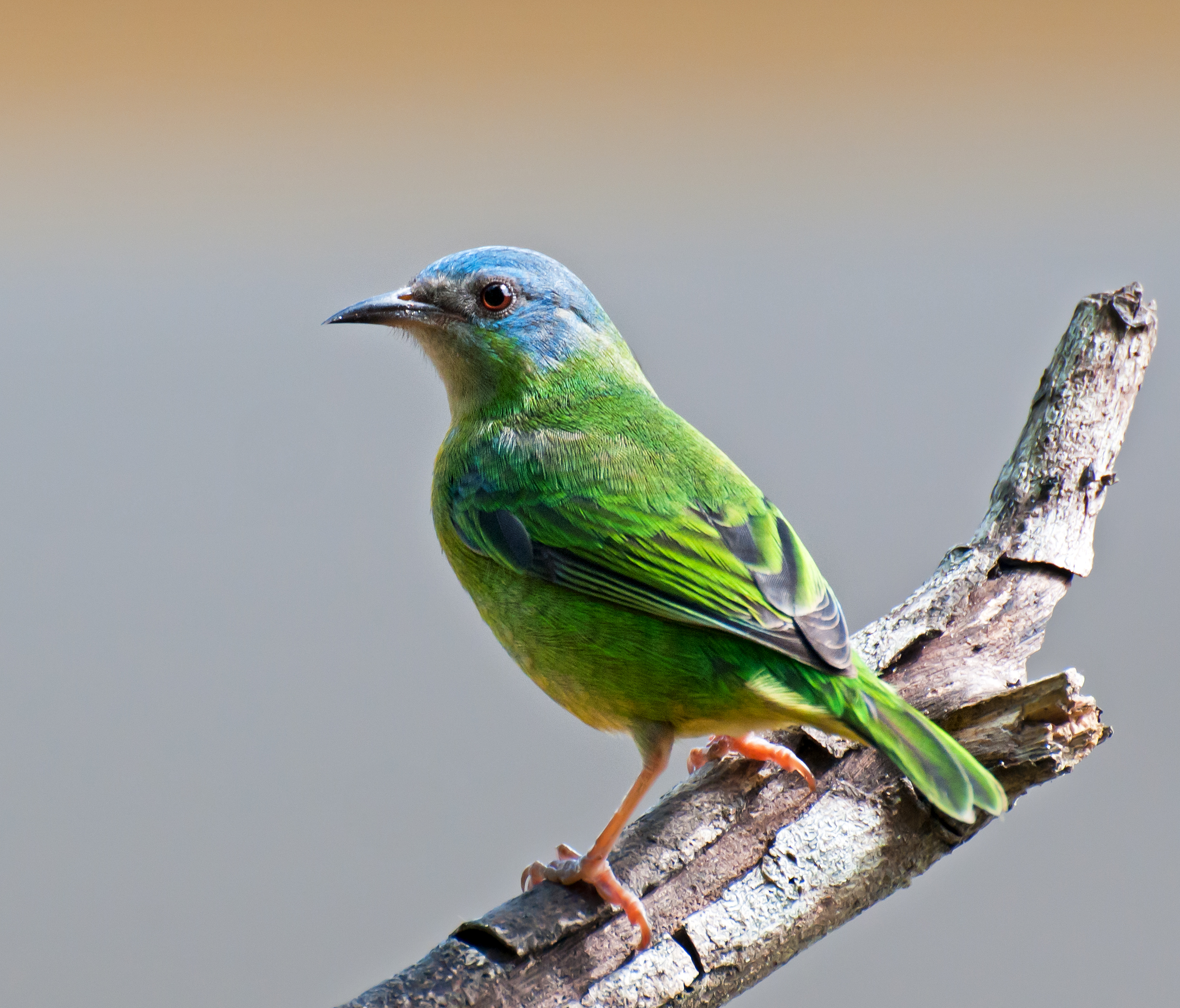
- Adult female in São Paulo, Brazil

Conservation status
- Least Concern (IUCN 3.1)

Scientific classification
- Kingdom: Animalia
- Phylum: Chordata
- Class: Aves
- Order: Passeriformes
- Family: Thraupidae
- Genus: Dacnis
- Species: D. cayana

Binomial name
- Dacnis cayana (Linnaeus, 1766)

Synonyms
- Motacilla cayana (protonym); Dacnis coerebicolor

= Blue dacnis =

Species of bird

The blue dacnis or turquoise honeycreeper (Dacnis cayana) is a small passerine bird in the family Thraupidae, the tanagers and allies. It is found in Central America from Honduras to Panama, on Trinidad, and in every mainland South American country except Chile and Uruguay.

== Taxonomy ==
In 1760, the French zoologist Mathurin Jacques Brisson included a description of the blue dacnis in his Ornithologie based on a specimen collected in "Cayenne" (French Guiana). He used the French name Le Pepit bleu de Cayenne and the Latin name Sylvia cayanensis caerulea. Although Brisson coined Latin names, these do not conform to the binomial system and are not recognized by the International Commission on Zoological Nomenclature. When in 1766 the Swedish naturalist Carl Linnaeus updated his Systema Naturae for the twelfth edition he added 240 species that had been previously described by Brisson. One of these was the blue dacnis. Linnaeus included a terse description, coined the binomial Motacilla cayana and cited Brisson's work. The specific epithet cayana is from Cayenne. This species is now placed in the genus Dacnis that was introduced in 1816 by the French naturalist Georges Cuvier with the blue dacnis as the type species.

The blue dacnis has these eight subspecies:

- D. c. callaina Bangs, 1905
- D. c. ultramarina Lawrence, 1864
- D. c. napaea Bangs, 1898
- D. c. baudoana Meyer de Schauensee, 1946
- D. c. caerebicolor Sclater, PL, 1851
- D. c. cayana (Linnaeus, 1766)
- D. c. glaucogularis Berlepsch & Stolzmann, 1896
- D. c. paraguayensis Chubb, C, 1910

The purplish honeycreeper (Chlorophanes purpurascens), a bird from Venezuela known only from the type specimen, is considered to be an intergeneric hybrid between the green honeycreeper (Chlorophanes spiza) and either the red-legged honeycreeper (Cyanerpes cyaneus) or the blue dacnis.

== Description ==
The blue dacnis is 11 to 12 cm (4.3 to 4.7 in) long and weighs 10 to 15.5 g (0.35 to 0.55 oz). It has a thin pointed bill. The species is sexually dimorphic. Adult males of the nominate subspecies D. c. cayana have a mostly turquoise-blue head and nape with a thin black mask from the lores to just past the eye. Their mantle and back are black; the color narrows to a point just above the rump. Their scapulars, the sides of their back, and their rump and uppertail coverts are turquoise-blue. Their tail is black with very thin blue edges on the outer two or three pairs of feathers. Their upperwing coverts are mostly black with blue edges. Their flight feathers are black with wide blue edges. The center of their throat is black and the rest of their underparts are turquoise. Adult females are mostly green with paler underparts than upperparts. Their head is mostly bluish and their throat gray. Both sexes of all subspecies have a dark red to reddish brown iris, a dusky bill with a pale gray inner half of the mandible, and pinkish legs and feet.

The other subspecies of the blue dacnis differ from the nominate and each other thus:

- D. c. callaina: male is a brighter cerulean blue
- D. c. ultramarina: male is medium blue, not turquoise
- D. c. napaea: male is rich cobalt blue; female has bluish violet head
- D. c. baudoana: male is dark violaceous blue; female has more and brighter blue on head
- D. c. caerebicolor: male is darkest, a bluish violet to purplish; female has bluish violet head
- D. c. glaucogularis: male is lighter turquoise blue with less deep black throat; female has deep blue crown and face
- D. c. paraguayensis male is similar to glaucogularis but paler

== Distribution and habitat ==
The subspecies of the blue dacnis are found thus:

- D. c. callaina: from central Puntarenas Province in Costa Rica south on the Pacific slope to Chiriquí Province in southwestern Panama
- D. c. ultramarina: from extreme eastern Honduras south on the Caribbean slope through Nicaragua, Costa Rica, and Panama into northwestern Colombia on the west side of the Gulf of Urabá
- D. c. napaea: Colombia from the Santa Marta region west to the Gulf of Urabá and the lower Magdalena River valley
- D. c. baudoana: from the Serranía del Baudó in northwestern Colombia south into northwestern Ecuador to northern Guayas and west-central Los Ríos provinces
- D. c. caerebicolor: Colombia's lower Cauca River and upper Magdalena valleys
- D. c. cayana: Trinidad; from Meta and Arauca departments in eastern Colombia east into Venezuela, there on east side of the Serranía del Perijá, both slopes of the Andes, and the eastern half of the country including the Coastal Ranges, continuing across the Guianas and northern Brazil
- D. c. glaucogularis: from Caquetá and Putumayo departments in southeastern Colombia south through eastern Ecuador and eastern Peru into northern and eastern Bolivia
- D. c. paraguayensis: Brazil south of a line roughly between central Mato Grosso and Maranhão to northern Rio Grande do Sul and through eastern Paraguay into northeastern Argentina's Misiones Province

The blue dacnis inhabits a variety of moist to wet landscapes including terra firme and várzea forests, secondary forest, gallery forest, and somewhat open areas with trees and shrubs. In Honduras it is found below 750 m (2,500 ft). In Costa Rica it ranges in elevation from sea level to 900 m (3,000 ft) on the Caribbean slope and 1,200 m (3,900 ft) on the Pacific slope. In Venezuela it occurs below 1,200 m (3,900 ft) north of the Orinoco River and 1,400 m (4,600 ft) south of it. It reaches 1,100 m (3,600 ft) in Colombia, 1,000 m (3,300 ft) in Ecuador, 1,500 m (4,900 ft) in Peru, and 1,400 m (4,600 ft) in Brazil.

== Behavior ==
=== Movement ===
The blue dacnis is almost entirely a year-round resident though some seasonal elevational movements have been noted in Colombia.

=== Feeding ===
The blue dacnis feeds on arthropods, fruit, seeds, and possibly nectar. In a study in Panama, out of 26 species of plants the species fed on, more than a third of its take was Miconia berries and a quarter was from the family Euphorbiaceae. Other fruits are from Cecropia and Clusia, and it will feed on bananas at bird feeders. It primarily forages singly or in pairs, but groups of about 12 have been noted. It almost always is seen as a member of a mixed-species feeding flock. It feeds acrobatically, leaning, reaching, and hanging upside down to reach fruit and insects. It also takes insects in mid-air with a sally from a perch.

=== Breeding ===
The blue dacnis breeds between May and October in Costa Rica but its breeding seasons elsewhere are not known. Its nest is a deep cup, almost a pouch, built from soft plant fibers and seed down. It typically is suspended between twigs at the outer part of a tree. The clutch is two eggs. The incubation period, time to fledging, and details of parental care are not known.

=== Vocalization ===
The song of the blue dacnis in Peru is "a wheezy series of thin, high notes, somewhat variable in pattern, for example: wee-tee tsee-tew wee-tee tsee-tew wee-tee, interspersed with call notes". Its calls are weak and include "high, thin tsit notes and a high chit or chit-it or tseep".

== Status ==
The IUCN has assessed the blue dacnis as being of Least Concern. It has an extremely large range; its estimated population of at least 50 million mature individuals is believed to be decreasing. No immediate threats have been identified. It is uncommon in Honduras, "fairly uncommon" in Costa Rica, common in Colombia, Ecuador, and Venezuela, "fairly common" in Peru, and "common to frequent" in Brazil. It is found "in many protected areas, and vast areas of its range in the Guianas and Amazonia contain extensive intact habitat that is unprotected but at little immediate risk".

== Gallery ==
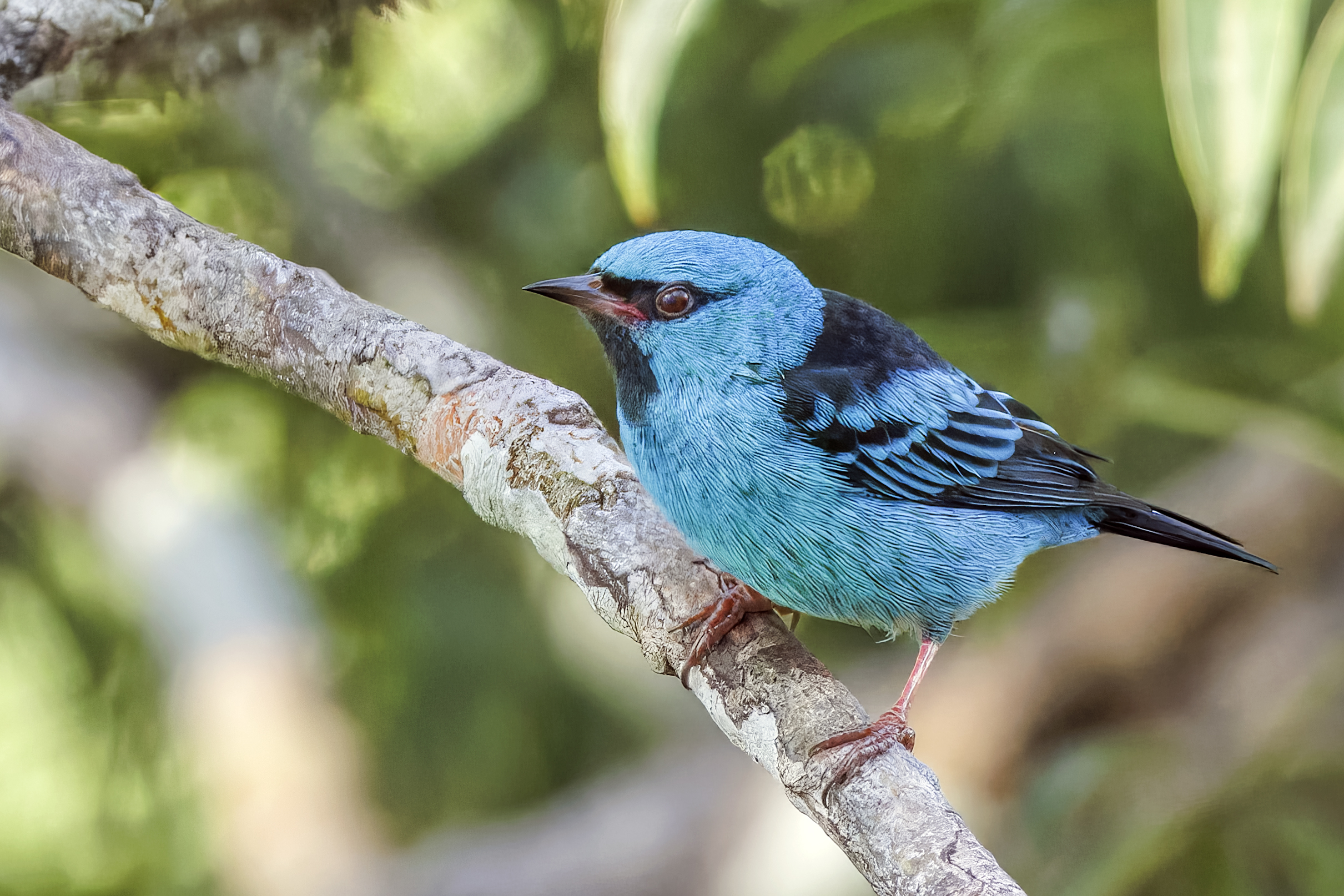
Male D. c. glaucogularis

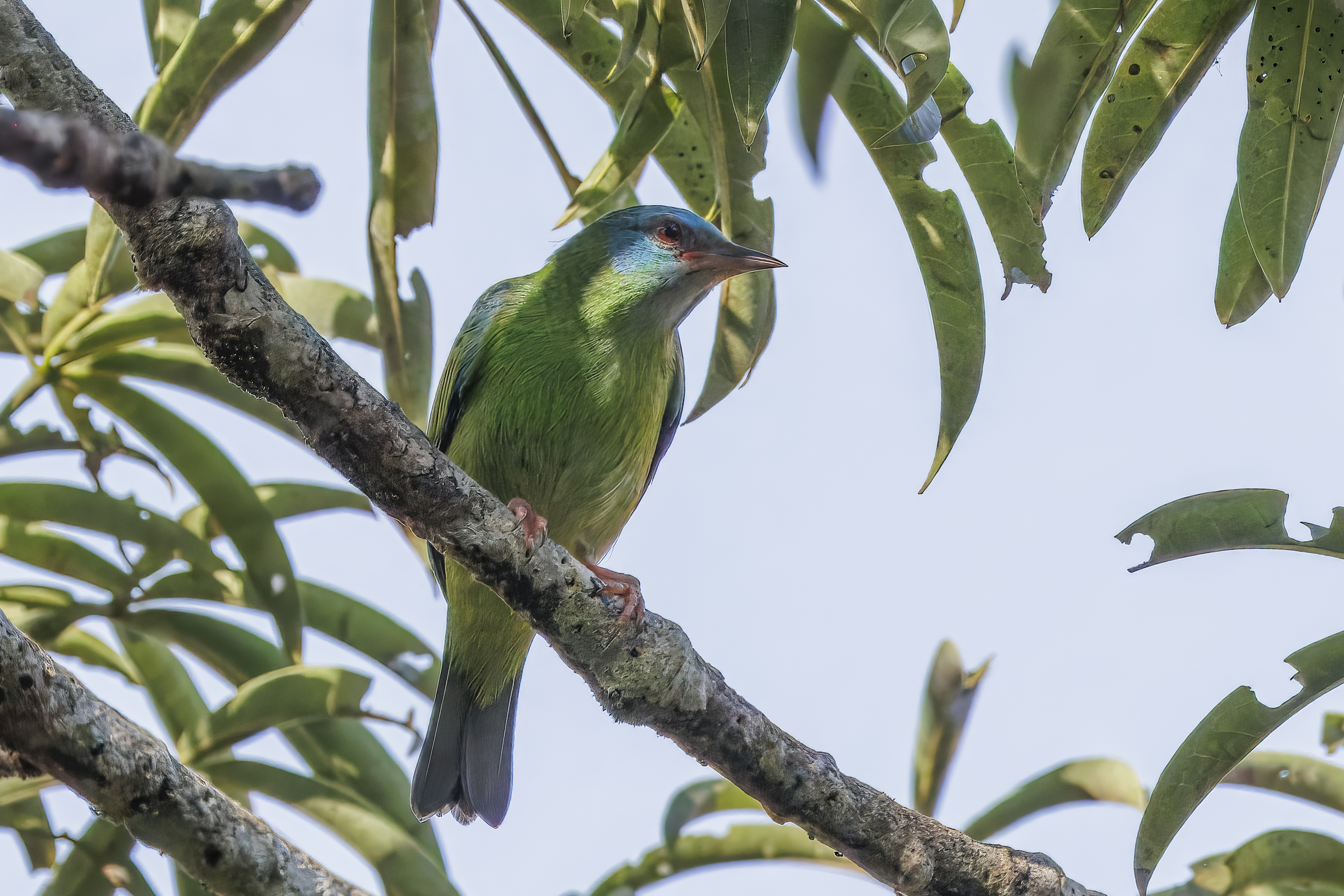
Female D. c. glaucogularis
