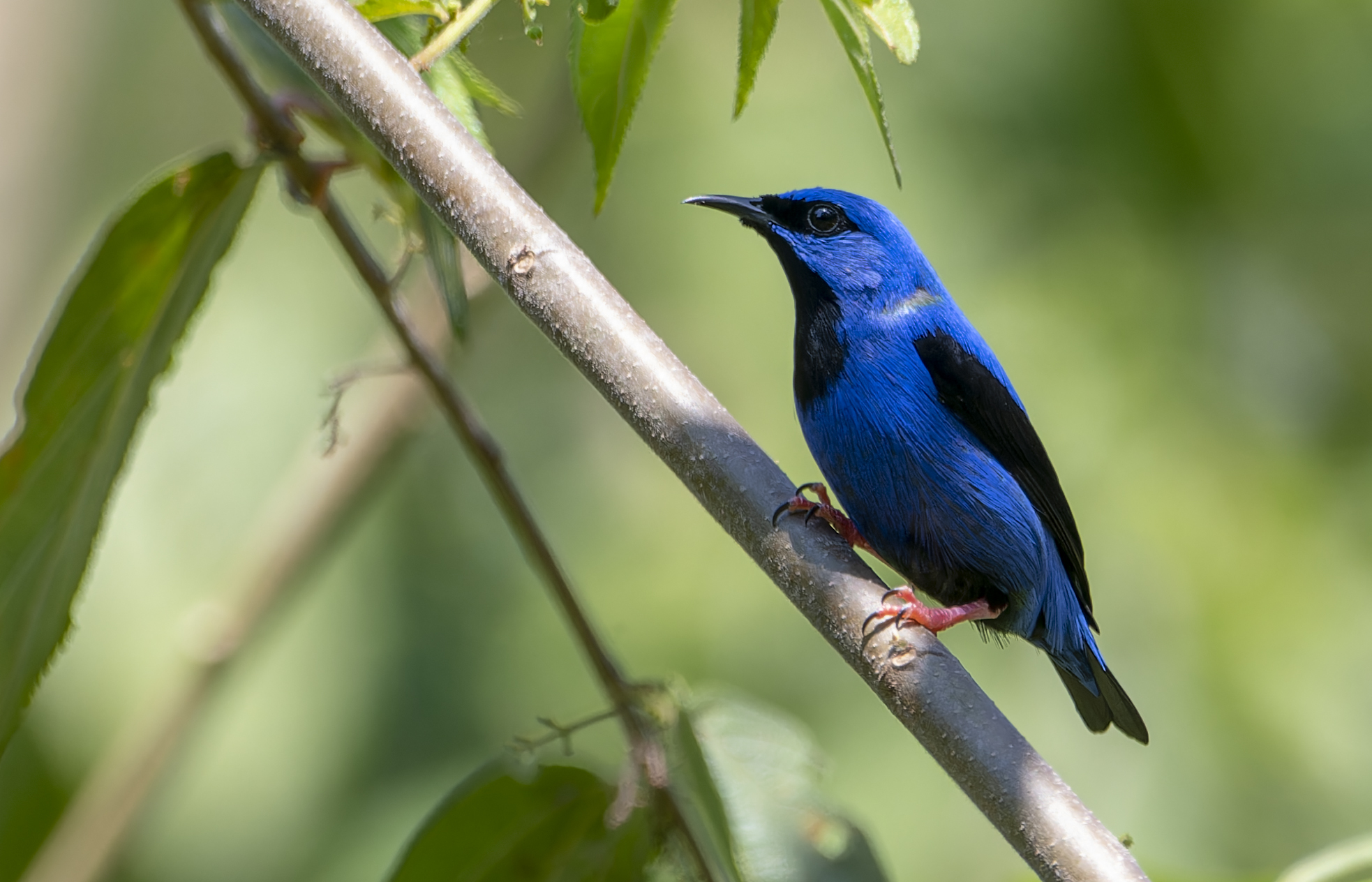

Conservation status
- Least Concern (IUCN 3.1)

Scientific classification
- Kingdom: Animalia
- Phylum: Chordata
- Class: Aves
- Order: Passeriformes
- Family: Thraupidae
- Genus: Cyanerpes
- Species: C. nitidus

Binomial name
- Cyanerpes nitidus (Hartlaub, 1847)

= Short-billed honeycreeper =

Species of bird

The short-billed honeycreeper (Cyanerpes nitidus) is a species of bird in the family Thraupidae, the tanagers and allies. It is found in Bolivia, Brazil, Colombia, Ecuador, Guyana, Peru, Suriname, and Venezuela.

== Taxonomy and systematics ==
The short-billed honeycreeper was formally described in 1847 with the binomial Coereba nitida, as a member of a genus now occupied solely by the bananaquit (C. flaveola). It now shares genus Cyanerpes with three other species. It is monotypic.

== Description ==
The short-billed honeycreeper is 9 cm (3.5 in) to 10.5 cm (4.1 in) long. It weighs about 9 g (0.32 oz). It is the smallest member of its genus and has a somewhat shorter and less decurved bill than the others. The species is sexually dimorphic. Adult males are mostly purplish blue. They have a small black mask from the lores to just past the eye, a black throat and upper breast, black upperwing coverts, and a short black tail. Adult females have a mostly bright green head and a bright green nape and upperparts. They have dusky lores, a turquoise-green supercilium, and a turquoise-green malar stripe. Their upperwing coverts are bright green and their flight feathers brownish black with wide green edges. Their tail is mostly brownish black with green middle feathers and green tips on the next pair. Their throat is buff, their breast and sides dull white with an ochre tinge and green streaks, and their belly and undertail coverts buff. Both sexes have a dark brown iris and a black bill. Males' legs and feet are reddish and females' pale pink.

== Distribution and habitat ==
The short-billed honeycreeper is a bird of the central and western Amazon Basin. It is found in Venezuela in the southwestern half of Bolivar and essentially all of Amazonas states. From there its range extends east through Guyana into Suriname and south through the southeastern third of Colombia, through eastern Ecuador at widely scattered locations, and into northeastern Peru to eastern Pasco Department. From Colombia and Peru its range extends east into western Brazil to a line roughly traced from northern Amazonas to southern Pará and northern Mato Grosso and back west to western Rondônia (where it slightly extends into far northern Bolivia) and west-central Amazonas.

The short-billed honeycreeper primarily inhabits the canopy, edges, and moderately treed clearings of tall terra firme and várzea forest. Much of its habitat is on nutrient-poor soils such as white sands and yellow soils. In elevation it reaches about 400 m (1,300 ft) in Venezuela, Colombia, Ecuador, and Brazil and 1,000 m (3,300 ft) in Peru.

== Behavior ==
=== Movement ===
The short-billed honeycreeper is a year-round resident.

=== Feeding ===
The short-billed honeycreeper's diet has not been studied but is known to include fruit, insects and other arthropods, nectar, and seeds. They typically forage singly or in pairs and almost always as members of a mixed-species feeding flock. Unlike the other three members of the genus, they seldom gather in same-species flocks. They take most of their prey from foliage in the forest canopy.

=== Breeding ===
Nothing is known about the short-billed honeycreeper's breeding biology.

=== Vocalization ===
As of August 2026 neither xeno-canto nor the Cornell Lab of Ornithology's Macaulay Library had recordings of a short-billed honeycreeper song. Its call has been described as "a short, high, rising tsee?".

== Status ==
The IUCN has assessed the short-billed honeycreeper as being of Least Concern. It has a very large range; its population size is not known and is believed to be decreasing. No immediate threats have been identified. In Venezuela it is fairly common in sandy soil forest but "uncommon with records widely scattered" elsewhere. It is "locally common" in Colombia, "rare and local" in Ecuador, "uncommon to locally fairly common" in Peru, and "uncommon to rare" in Brazil. It occurs in several protected areas and has "a high sensitivity to human disturbance".
