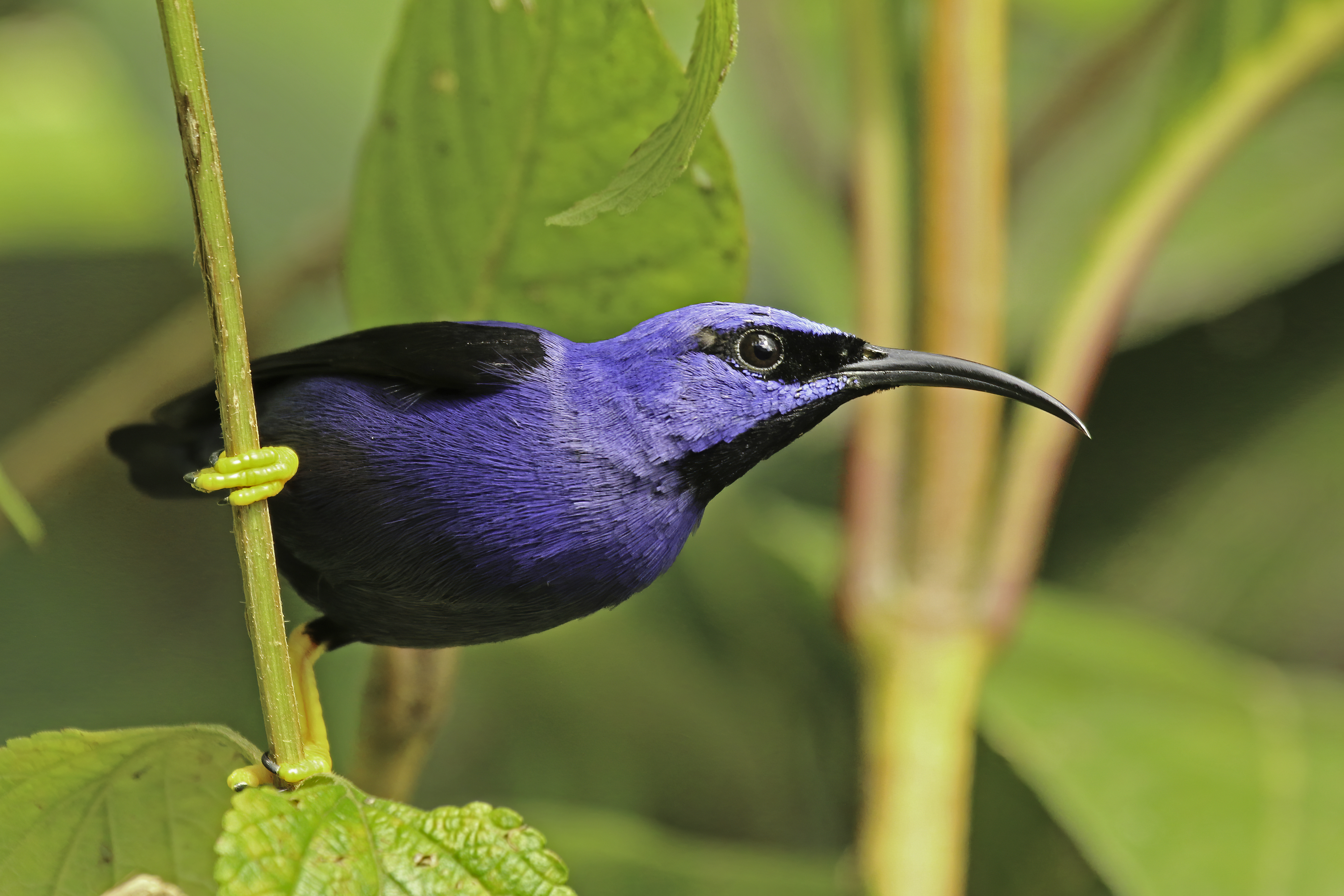
- Adult male C. c. longirostris, Trinidad
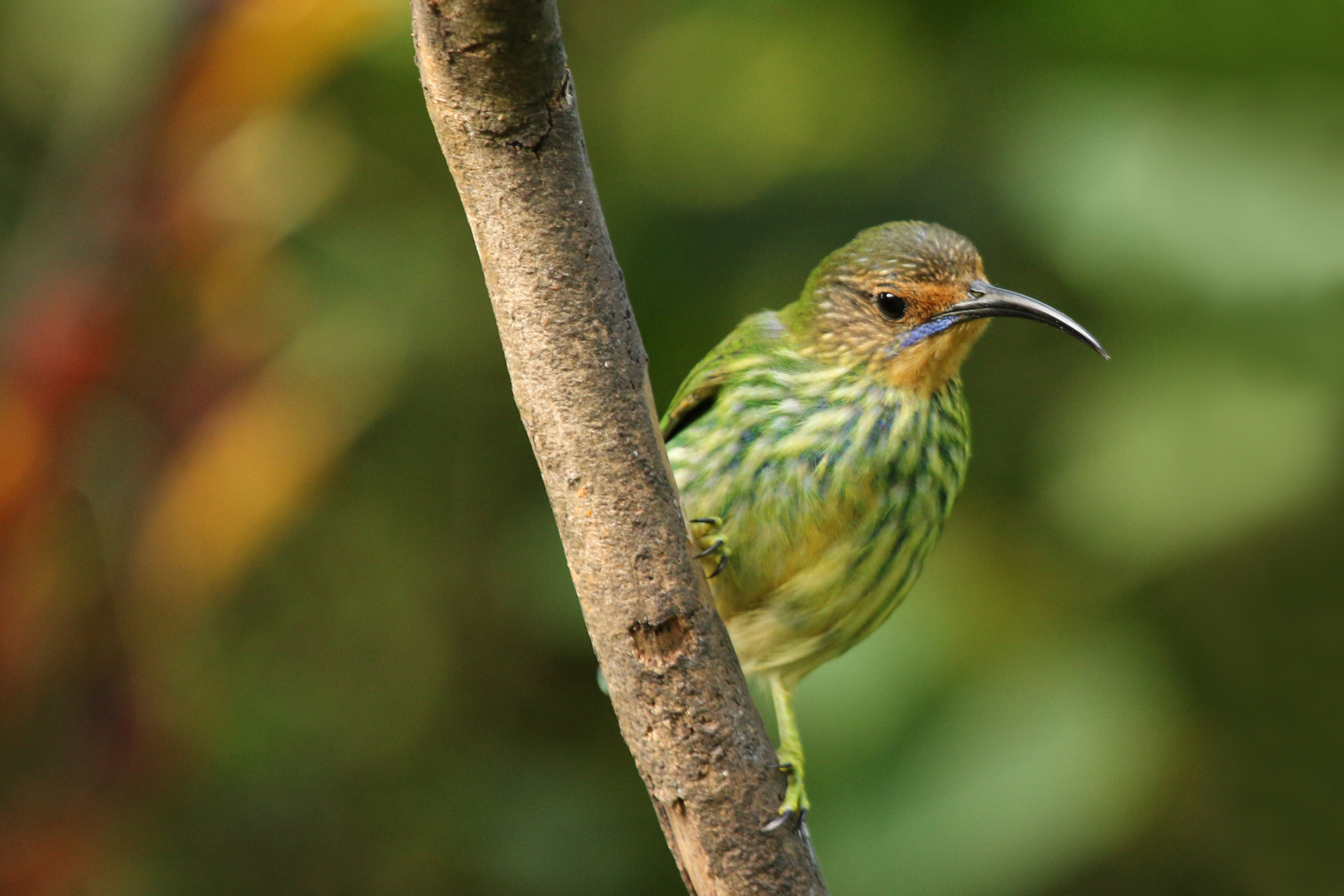
- Adult female C. c. longirostris, Trinidad

Conservation status
- Least Concern (IUCN 3.1)

Scientific classification
- Kingdom: Animalia
- Phylum: Chordata
- Class: Aves
- Order: Passeriformes
- Family: Thraupidae
- Genus: Cyanerpes
- Species: C. caeruleus

Binomial name
- Cyanerpes caeruleus (Linnaeus, 1758)

Synonyms
- Certhia caerulea

= Purple honeycreeper =

Species of bird

The purple honeycreeper (Cyanerpes caeruleus) is a small Neotropical bird in the family Thraupidae, the tanagers and allies. It is found in Panama, on Trinidad, and in every mainland South American country except Argentina, Chile, Paraguay, and Uruguay.

== Taxonomy and systematics ==
The purple honeycreeper was formally described by the Swedish naturalist Carl Linnaeus in 1758 in the tenth edition of his Systema Naturae with the binomial Certhia caerulea. Linnaeus based his description on "The Blue Creeper" that had been described and illustrated in 1743 by the English naturalist George Edwards from specimens collected in Suriname. The specimens had been mounted in glass cases and were owned by the Duke of Richmond. The purple honeycreeper was reassigned to the genus Cyanerpes by the American ornithologist Harry C. Oberholser when he erected the genus in 1899. The specific epithet caeruleus is Latin for "dark blue".

The purple honeycreeper has these five subspecies:

- C. c. chocoanus Hellmayr, 1920
- C. c. caeruleus (Linnaeus, 1758)
- C. c. hellmayri Gyldenstolpe, 1945
- C. c. longirostris (Cabanis, 1851)
- C. c. microrhynchus (Berlepsch, 1884)

== Description ==
The purple honeycreeper is 9.3 to 11.4 cm (3.7 to 4.5 in) long and weighs 7.8 to 14 g (0.28 to 0.49 oz). The species is sexually dimorphic. Adult males of the nominate subspecies C. c. caeruleus are mostly violet-blue with a slightly lighter face. They have black lores and a narrow black mask to past the eye. The center of their throat is black. Their upperwing coverts, flight feathers, and tail are black. Adult females have a green crown and nape, buffy lores, a buffy eye-ring, a bright blue malar stripe, and a cinnamon-buff supercilium and ear coverts. Their upperparts and tail are green. Their throat is buffy, their breast and flanks off-white with greenish olive streaks, their belly a light yellow, and their undertail coverts white. Their flight feathers are dusky with variable amounts of yellow-green and green on the edges. Juveniles resemble adult females with somewhat plainer breast and flanks. Both sexes of all subspecies have a brown to black iris and a slender decurved black bill. Males have yellow legs and feet; females' are light green to olive-yellow.

The other subspecies of the purple honeycreeper differ from the nominate and each other thus:

- C. c. chocoanus: slightly smaller than nominate with a shorter bill; males are a paler, less purple, blue; females have less streaking on the underparts
- C. c. hellmayri: larger than nominate with significantly longer and heavier bill; males are violaceous-blue; females have a darker cinnamon-buff chin and throat, more greenish sides to the breast, and more brownish ear coverts
- C. c. longirostris: longer bill than nominate; males are somewhat more purplish
- C. c. microrhynchus: smaller than nominate with a shorter bill; males are less purplish and have a brighter blue crown

== Distribution and habitat ==
The purple honeycreeper has a disjunct distribution. The subspecies are found thus:

- C. c. chocoanus: from extreme eastern Panama in Darién Province south along the Pacific slope of Colombia and Ecuador to El Oro Province
- C. c. caeruleus: from the eastern slope of Colombia's Eastern Andes into Venezuela's Falcón; the Venezuelan Coastal Ranges from Carabobo east to Sucre and Delta Amacuro; Venezuela's eastern Amazonas and most of Bolívar states and across the Guianas and north-central Brazil to the Tapajós River and northwestern Maranhão state
- C. c. hellmayri: Guyana's Potaro Highlands
- C. c. longirostris: Trinidad
- C. c. microrhynchus: Venezuela's western and southern Zulia, western Andean base in Táchira and Mérida, and eastern Andean base from Táchira to Lara; south of the Orinoco River in Venezuela's western Amazonas south through the southeastern third of Colombia, eastern Ecuador, and eastern Peru into northern Bolivia; east from that north-south line in Amazonian Brazil into Mato Grosso

The purple honeycreeper inhabits several types of evergreen forest in the lowlands and foothills. In the Amazon Basin it occurs in both terra firme and várzea forest. It also occurs in clearings within the forest, secondary forest, and the ecotone between evergreen forest and less fertile savanna, cerrado, and white-sand landscapes. In elevation it reaches 2,300 m (7,500 ft) in Colombia, 1,200 m (3,900 ft) in Ecuador, and 1,400 m (4,600 ft) in Peru. In Venezuela it reaches 1,500 m (4,900 ft) north of the Orinoco River and 1,800 m (5,900 ft) south of it. In Brazil it ranges from sea level to 1,200 m (3,900 ft).

== Behavior ==
=== Movement ===
The purple honeycreeper is primarily a resident. However, some local movements that are thought to be responses to fruit and nectar availability have been noted.

=== Feeding ===
The purple honeycreeper feeds primarily on arthropods including insects and spiders, and also includes significant amounts of fruit and nectar in its diet. Fruit and nectar are sourced from a very wide variety of plants and the species is "considered very important pollinators and seed dispersers". Its bill shape allows it to take nectar from bromeliads and fleshy arils from plants such as Clusia rosea. At the Asa Wright Nature Center on Trinidad it readily feeds on nectar from hummingbird feeders and on banana and papaya on tray feeders. The species forages actively, primarily in the forest subcanopy and canopy. They typically forage in pairs or family groups and often join mixed-species feeding flocks. In one study they took most insect prey from small twigs and lesser amounts from leaves, flowers, and in mid-air.

=== Breeding ===
The purple honeycreeper appears to breed at the beginning of the local rainy season, which varies greatly across the species' wide latitudinal span. Its breeding spans at least March to July in Colombia and within the February to June window at other northern locations. Its nest is a cup made from moss and leaves lined with rootlets; some were in the tops of stumps and others at the end of a tree branch. Two very different descriptions of eggs have been published. One described a white egg with dark brown to pink-brown blotches and the other a deep purplish buff base color almost covered with dense blackish brown blotches. The clutch is two eggs; the female alone incubates, for about 12 to 13 days. The time to fledging is not known. Both parents provision nestlings.

=== Vocalization ===
The purple honeycreeper does not appear to have a song. Its vocalizations have been described as "a zhree call, sometimes repeated, [and] less often a tsik". Another call is "a short, high, lisping psit".

=== Predation ===
There is a record of a grey hawk (Buteo plagiatus) taking a purple honeycreeper from a feeding flock. The species is known to mob potential predators like the ferruginous pygmy owl (Glaucidium brasilianum).

== Status ==
The IUCN has assessed the purple honeycreeper as being of Least Concern. It has an extremely large range; its estimated population of at least five million mature individuals is believed to be stable. No immediate threats have been identified. The purple honeycreeper is the "most common and widespread Cyanerpes honeycreeper". It is common in Colombia, "often common" in Ecuador, "fairly common" in Peru and Venezuela, and "common to frequent" in Brazil. The species occurs in a very large number of protected areas and has "a medium degree of sensitivity to human disturbance relative to other Neotropical birds".

== Gallery ==
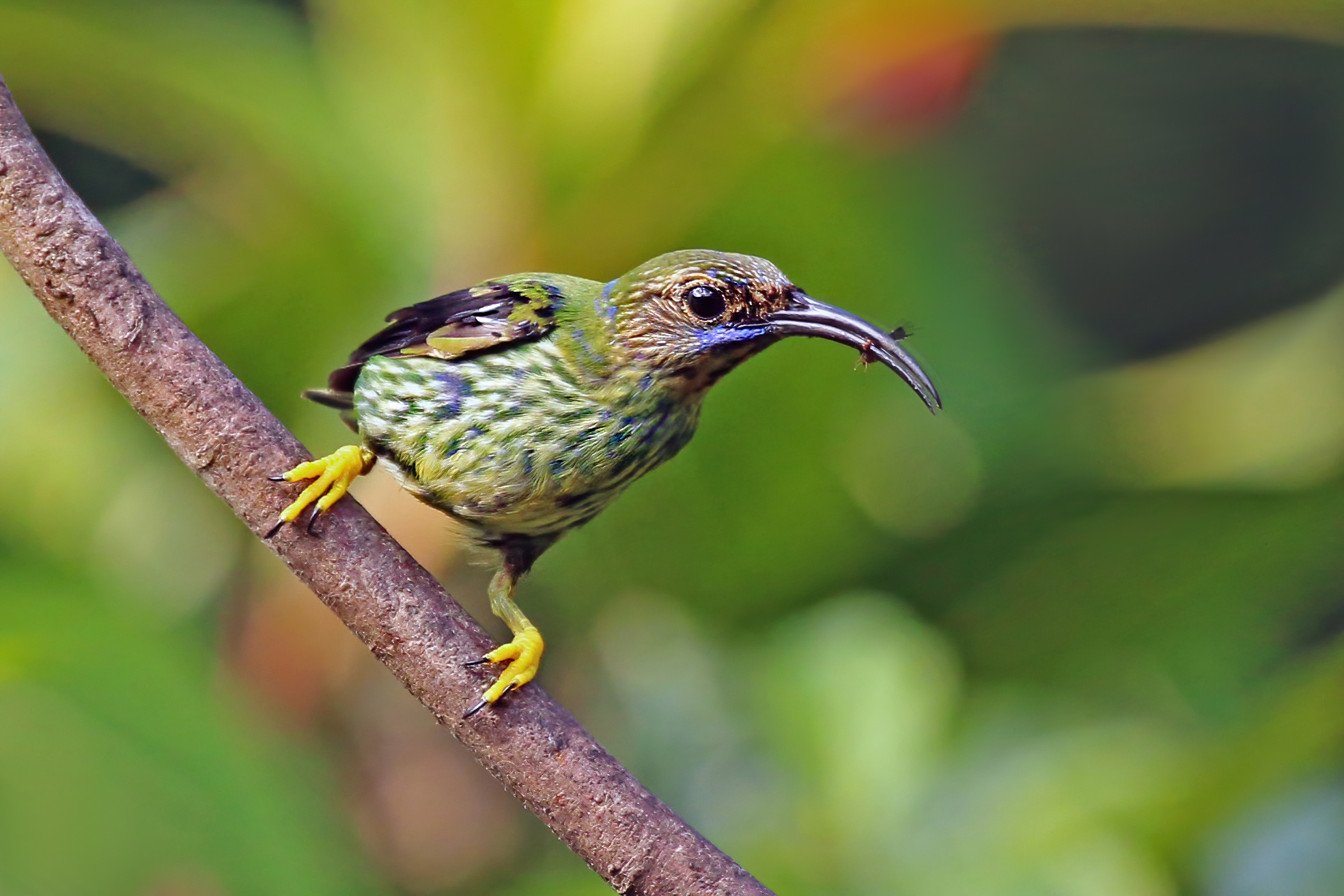
Juvenile male C. c. longirostris, Trinidad

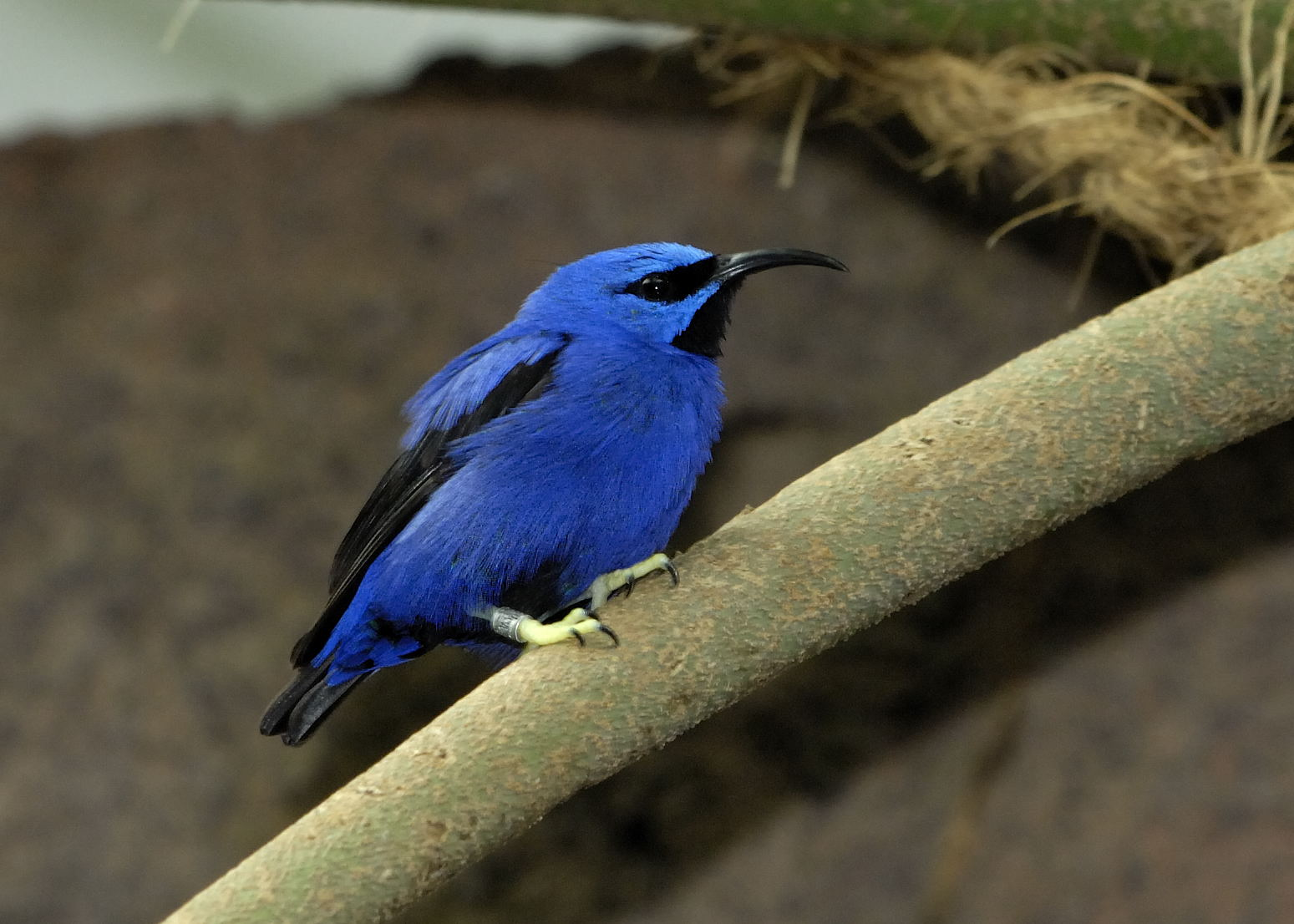
Adult male at Vienna Zoo, Austria

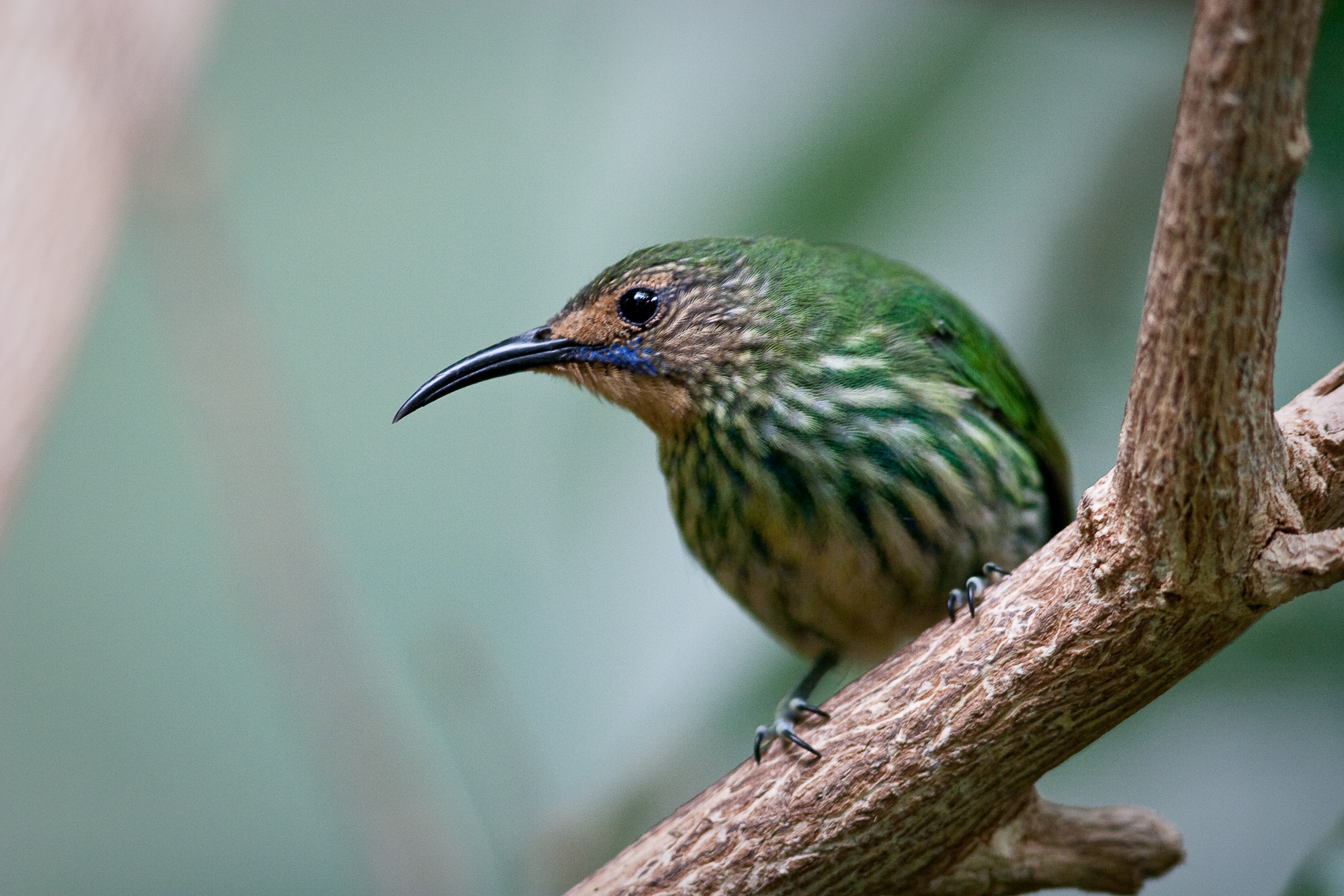
Female at Diergaarde Blijdorp, Netherlands
