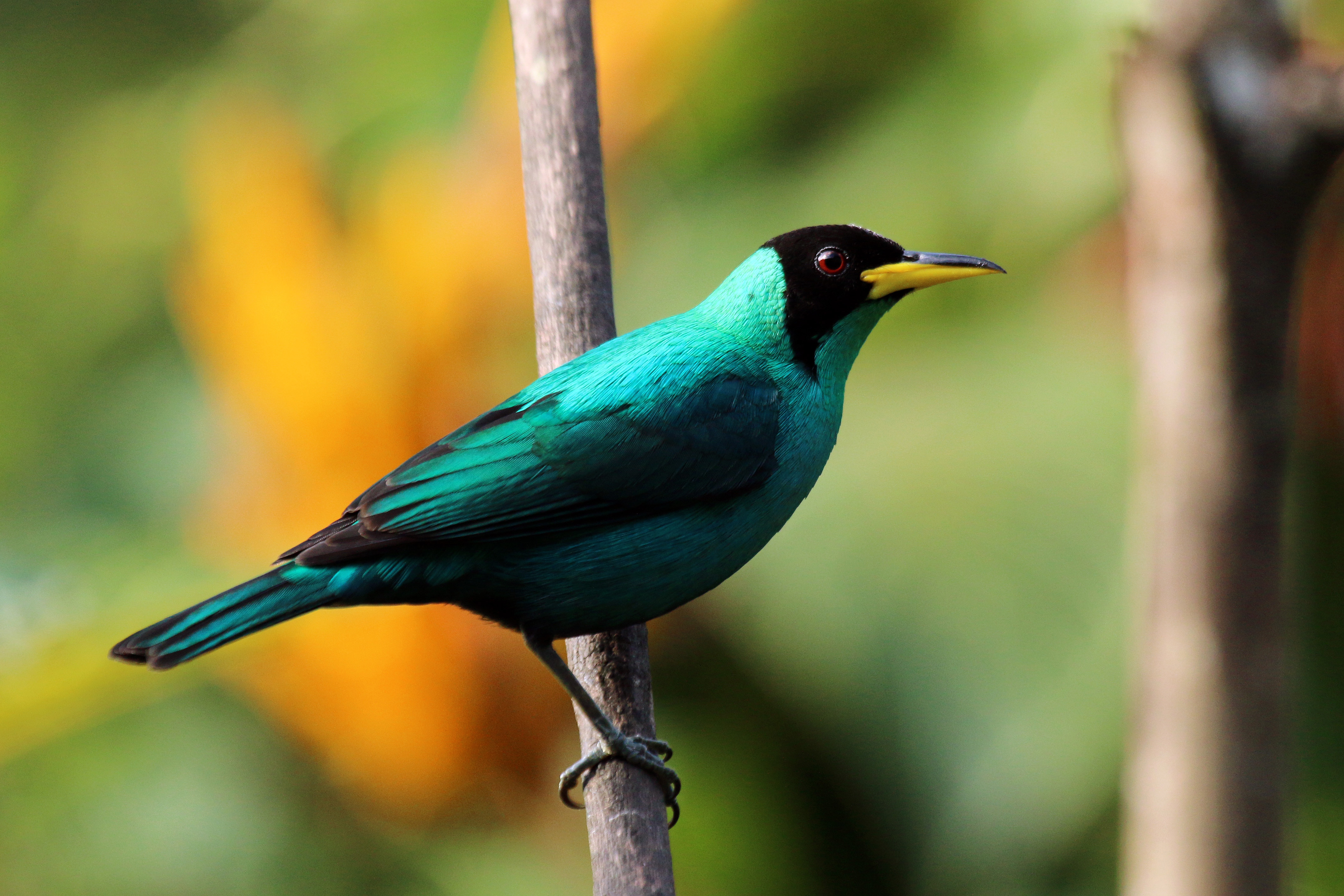
- Adult male C. s. spiza, Trinidad
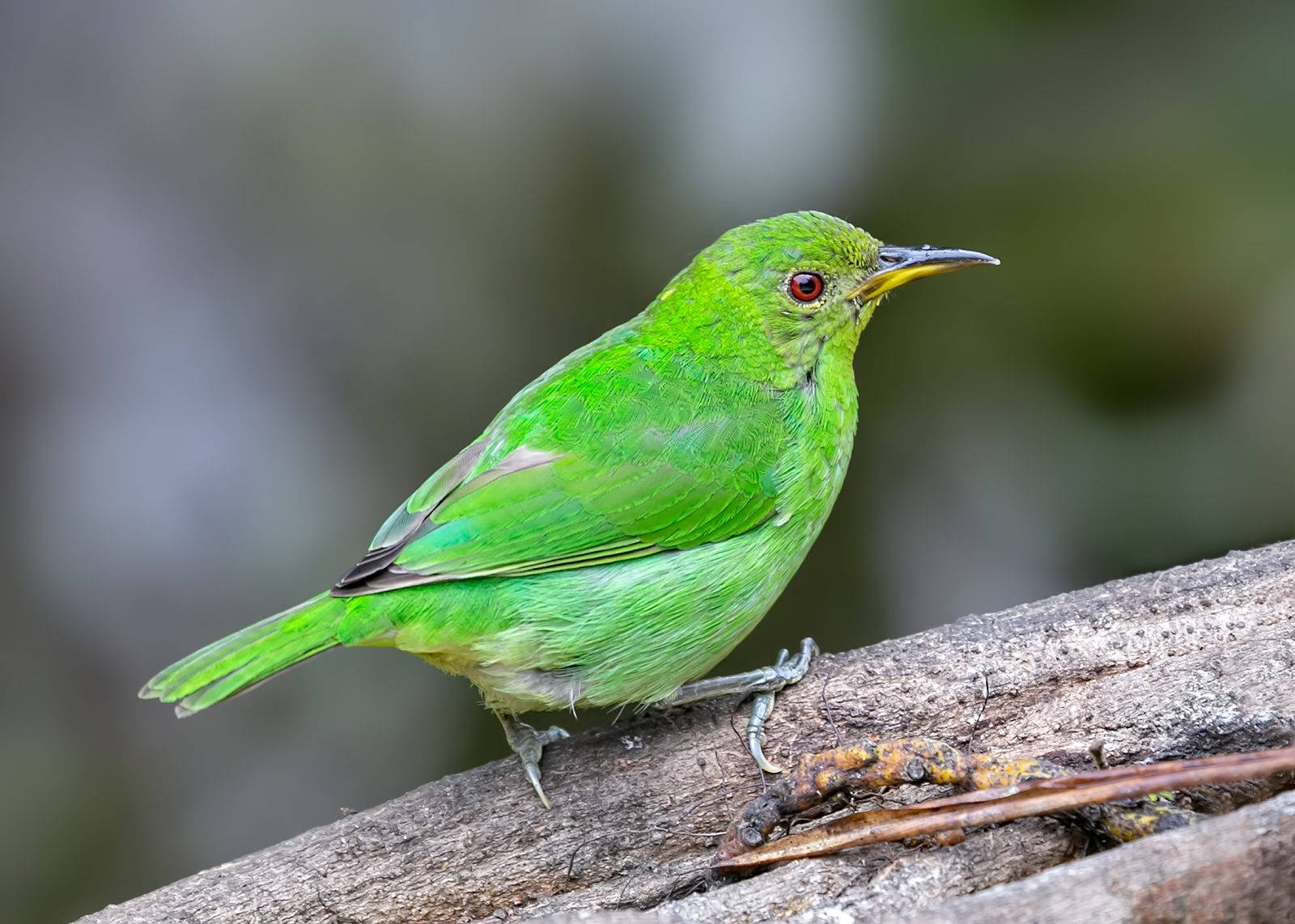
- Female C. s. argutus, Costa Rica

Conservation status
- Least Concern (IUCN 3.1)

Scientific classification
- Kingdom: Animalia
- Phylum: Chordata
- Class: Aves
- Order: Passeriformes
- Family: Thraupidae
- Genus: Chlorophanes; Reichenbach, 1853
- Species: C. spiza

Binomial name
- Chlorophanes spiza (Linnaeus, 1758)

Synonyms
- Motacilla spiza Linnaeus, 1758; Certhia spiza Linnaeus, 1766

= Green honeycreeper =

Species of bird

The green honeycreeper (Chlorophanes spiza) is a species of bird in the family Thraupidae, the tanagers and allies. It is found in the tropical New World from southern Mexico south to Brazil, and on Trinidad.

== Taxonomy and systematics ==
The green honeycreeper was formally described in 1758 by the Swedish naturalist Carl Linnaeus in the tenth edition of his Systema Naturae under the name Motacilla spiza. He specified the type locality as Suriname. The specific epithet is the Ancient Greek word for a common finch. Linnaeus based his description on the "green black-cap fly-catcher" that the English naturalist George Edwards had described and illustrated in his 1743 book A Natural History of Uncommon Birds. In 1853 the German naturalist Ludwig Reichenbach erected the genus Chlorophanes to accommodate the green honeycreeper. The name combines the Ancient Greek khlōros meaning green with -phanēs meaning showing.

For a time in the twentieth century the green honeycreeper and the golden-collared honeycreeper (Iridophanes pulcherrimus) were treated as conspecific. The genus Chlorphanes was placed in the family Coerebidae that was later merged into Thraupidae. A comprehensive molecular phylogenetic study of the tanager family Thraupidae published in 2014 found that the green and the golden-collared honeycreepers are sister species.

The purplish honeycreeper (Chlorophanes purpurascens), a bird from Venezuela known only from the type specimen, is now thought to be an intergeneric hybrid between the green honeycreeper and either the red-legged honeycreeper (Cyanerpes cyaneus) or the blue dacnis (Dacnis cayana).

The green honeycreeper is the only member of genus Chlorphanes. It has these seven subspecies:

- C. s. guatemalensis Sclater, PL, 1861
- C. s. argutus Bangs & Barbour, 1922
- C. s. exsul Berlepsch & Taczanowski, 1884
- C. s. subtropicalis Todd, 1924
- C. s. spiza (Linnaeus, 1758)
- C. s. caerulescens Cassin, 1865
- C. s. axillaris Zimmer, JT, 1929

== Description ==
The green honeycreeper is about 13 cm (5.1 in) long and weighs 14 to 23 g (0.49 to 0.81 oz) with an average of about 19 g (0.67 oz). It has a slender and slightly decurved bill. The species is sexually dimorphic. Adult males of the nominate subspecies C. s. spiza have a mostly deep black head. Their throat, nape, and upper- and underparts are glossy viridian green that from some angles appears bluish. Their wing's primary coverts and flight feathers are dusky with viridian green edges. Their tail is viridian green with a black stripe in the center of the central pair of feathers. Their bill is mostly bright honey yellow with a black culmen. Adult females have a grass-green head and upperparts and paler green underparts. Their bill has a black maxilla and a dull honey yellow mandible with a dusky neutral gray tip and base. Both sexes have a bright reddish brown iris and gray legs and feet with yellow toe pads. Juveniles of both sexes resemble adult females but are duller overall with a more grayish belly. Their iris is a duller reddish brown than adults'.

The other subspecies of the green honeycreeper differ from the nominate and each other thus:

- C. s. guatemalensis: largest subspecies; males are deeper green than nominate, approaching turquoise
- C. s. argutus: males are more turquoise than guatemalensis but less than subtropicalis
- C. s. exsul: male somewhat purer green than nominate
- C. s. subtropicalis: male is mostly turquoise; female has yellow throat and yellow streaks on underparts
- C. s. caerulescens: male is mostly turquoise
- C. s. axillaris: male is slightly greener than nominate; female has brighter green underparts than nominate

== Distribution and habitat ==
The subspecies of the green honeycreeper are found thus:

- C. s. guatemalensis: from northern Oaxaca and southern Veracruz in southern Mexico across northern Guatemala, Belize, and northern Honduras
- C. s. argutus: from extreme eastern Honduras south on the Caribbean slope through Nicaragua, Costa Rica, and Panama into northwestern Colombia; from central Puntarenas and far west-central San José provinces in Costa Rica through Panama into Colombia
- C. s. exsul: from Valle del Cauca Department in southwestern Colombia south through western Ecuador into extreme northwestern Peru
- C. s. subtropicalis: Colombian Andes east into the Serranía del Perijá on the Colombia-Venezuela border and the western slope of the Venezuelan Andes from Táchira to Trujillo
- C. s. spiza: southeastern Colombia east along eastern slope of the Venezuelan Andes; Venezuelan Coastal Ranges from Carabobo to the Paria Peninsula; Trinidad; from Amazonas and western and southern Bolívar in Venezuela east across the Guianas and much of Amazonian Brazil
- C. s. caerulescens from southeastern Colombia south through eastern Peru and western Brazil into northern Bolivia
- C. s. axillaris: eastern Brazil from Paraiba south to extreme northern Rio Grande do Sul

The green honeycreeper inhabits the interior and edges of humid forest both primary and secondary. It is primarily a canopy species though is found lower at forest edges. In Brazil it is found in both terra firme and várzea forest and in that country ranges in elevation from sea level to 1,500 m (4,900 ft). It reaches 1,500 m (4,900 ft) in northern Central America and Costa Rica, 2,200 m (7,200 ft) in Colombia, 800 m (2,600 ft) in Ecuador, and 1,600 m (5,200 ft) in Peru. In Venezuela it reaches 1,250 m (4,100 ft) north of the Orinoco River and 1,400 m (4,600 ft) south of it.

== Behavior ==
=== Movement ===
The green honeycreeper is a year-round resident.

=== Feeding ===
The green honeycreeper feeds primarily on fruit and on lesser amounts of nectar and arthropods. In a study in Trinidad about 2/3 of the observed foraging was for fruit, and half of the fruit was Miconia berries. The species forages singly, in pairs, and as a member of mixed-species feeding flocks. Though it takes fruit and most insects from fruiting trees, it does sometimes take insects in mid-air.

=== Breeding ===
The green honeycreeper's breeding season has not been fully defined. It spans April to July in Costa Rica, June and July in Panama, and May to July in Trinidad. Females build the nest, a shallow cup made from dead leaves, fungal rhizomorphs, and rootlets and is lined with finer materials. The clutch is two eggs that are white with dark brown spots. The only noted incubation period was 13 days; the female alone incubated. The time to fledging is not known but both parents provision nestlings.

=== Vocalization ===
The green honeycreeper's song is seldom heard; it has been described as "a scratchy and high-pitched tst tst CHIT followed by a rapid chittering of tst notes". Its calls are described as "mostly high psit or tseet notes" and "a rich, descending tchup and a higher tseet".

== Status ==
The IUCN has assessed the green honeycreeper as being of Least Concern. It has an extremely large range; its estimated population of at least 500,000 mature individuals is believed to be decreasing. No immediate threats have been identified. It is considered "fairly common" in northern Central America and Costa Rica, "common" in Colombia, "widespread" in Ecuador, "fairly common and widespread" in Peru, "fairly common" in Venezuela, and "common to frequent" in Brazil.

== Gallery ==
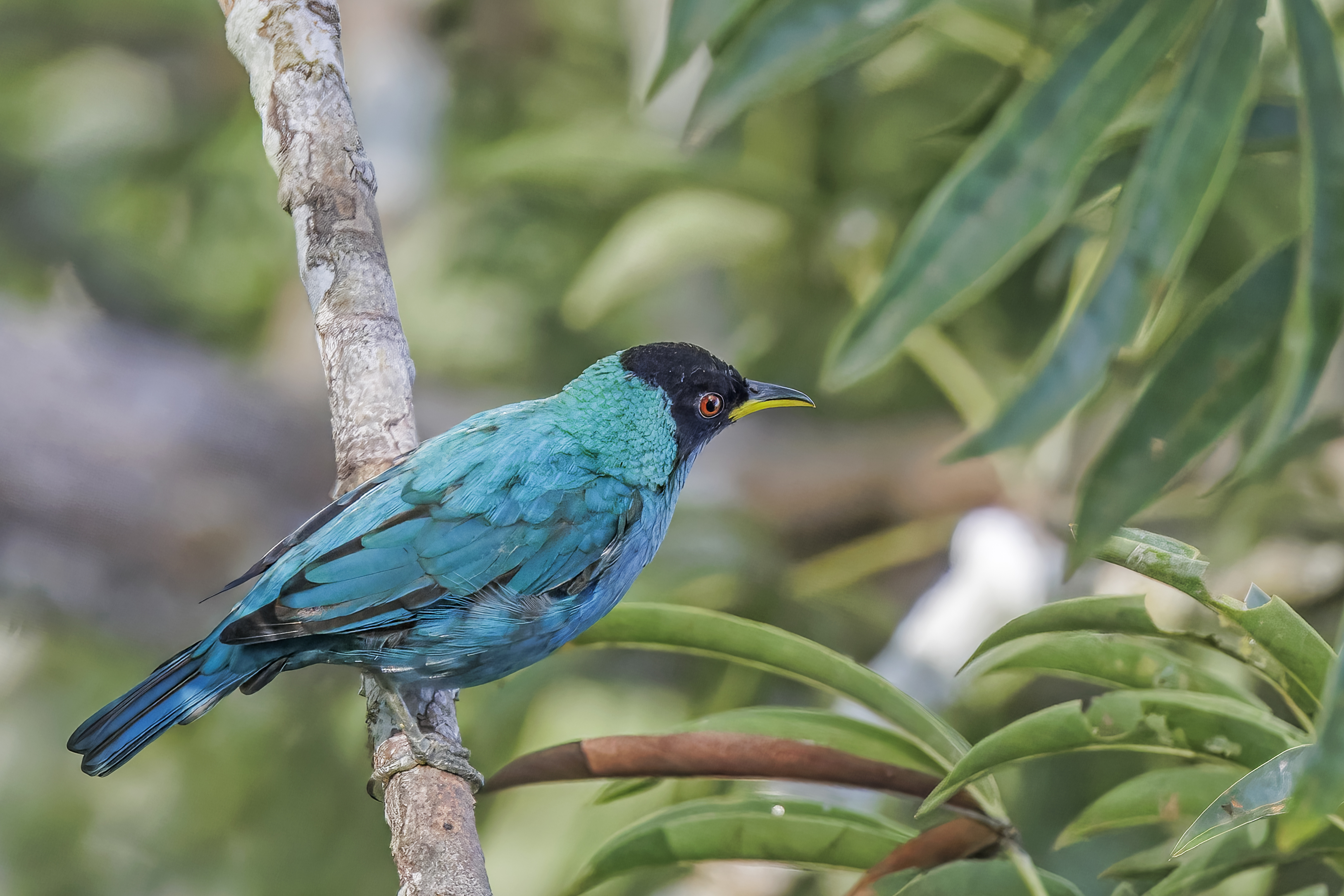
Male C. s. caerulescens
Ecuador

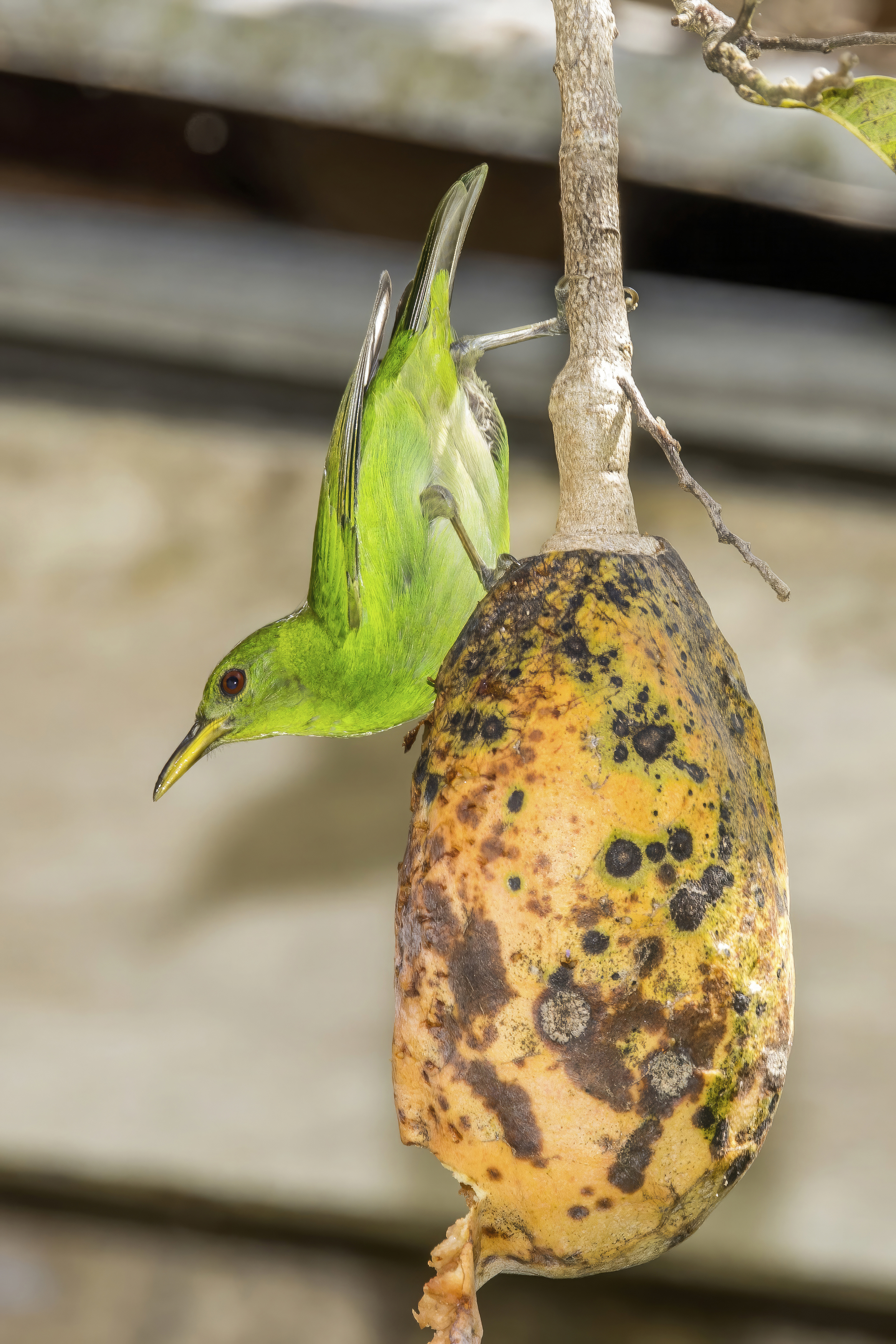
Female C. s. guatemalensis
Belize
