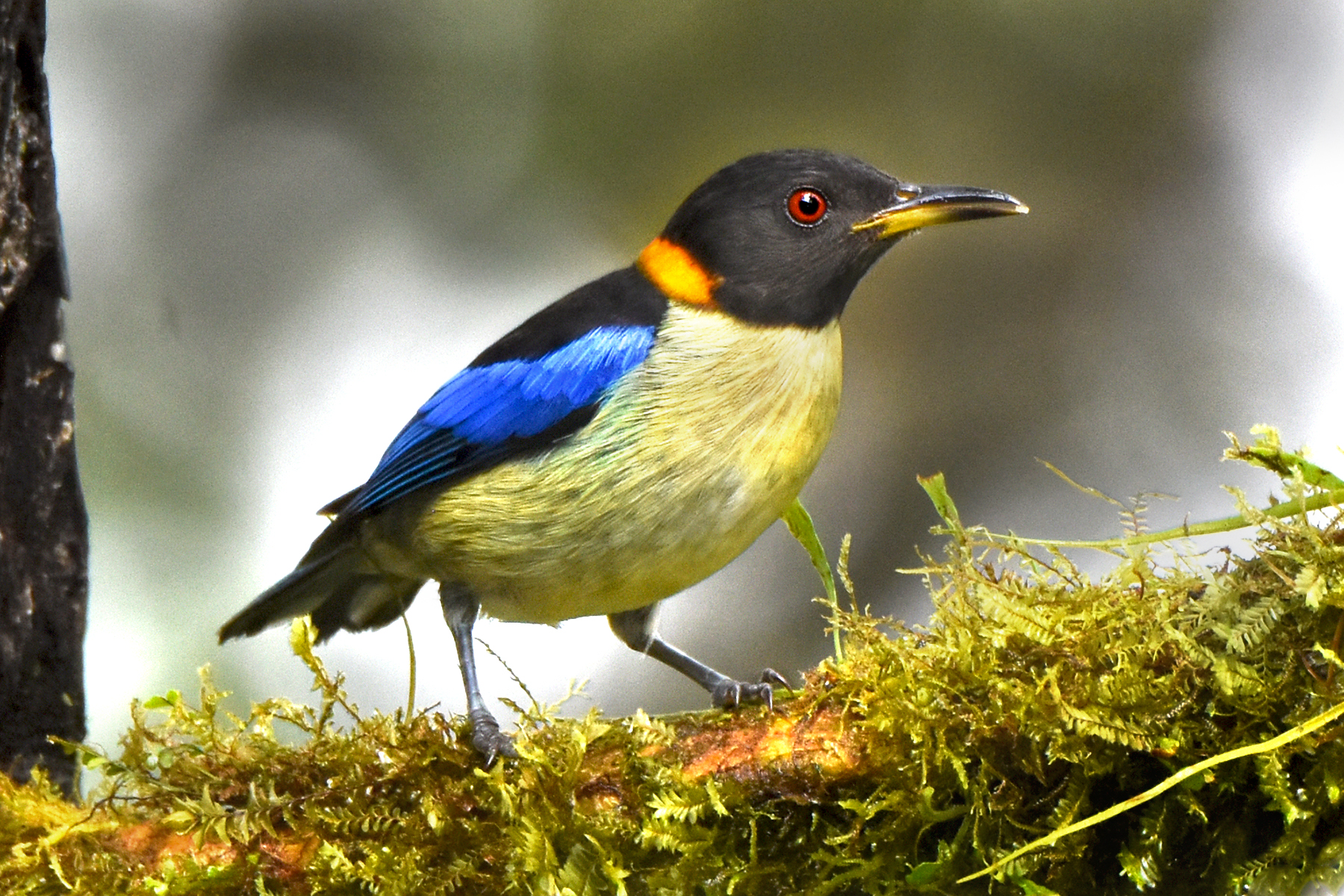
- Male in Ecuador

Conservation status
- Least Concern (IUCN 3.1)

Scientific classification
- Kingdom: Animalia
- Phylum: Chordata
- Class: Aves
- Order: Passeriformes
- Family: Thraupidae
- Genus: Iridophanes; Ridgway, 1901
- Species: I. pulcherrimus

Binomial name
- Iridophanes pulcherrimus (Sclater, PL, 1853)

Synonyms
- Dacnis pulcherrima (protonym); Tangara pulcherrima; Chlorophanes pulcherrimus

= Golden-collared honeycreeper =

Species of bird

The golden-collared honeycreeper (Iridophanes pulcherrimus) is a species of bird in the family Thraupidae, the tanagers and allies. It is found in Colombia, Ecuador, and Peru.

== Taxonomy and systematics ==
The golden-collared honeycreeper was formally described in 1853 by the English zoologist Philip Sclater from a specimen collected near Bogotá in Colombia. He coined the binomial Dacnis pulcherrima.

At the time the genus Dacnis was a member of the family Coerebidae. When Robert Ridgway erected the genus Iridophanes in 1901 with the golden-collared honeycreeper as the type species he placed it in its present tanager family. The genus name Iridophanes combines the Ancient Greek iris meaning "rainbow" and -phanēs meaning "showing". The specific epithet pulcherrimus is Latin for "very beautiful".

Some twentieth century authors placed the species in the genus Tangara. Also in the twentieth century, the golden-collared honeycreeper and the green honeycreeper (Chlorophanes spiza) were treated as conspecific. A comprehensive molecular phylogenetic study of the tanager family Thraupidae published in 2014 found that the golden-collared and the green honeycreepers are sister species.

The golden-collared honeycreeper the only species in the genus Iridophanes. It has two subspecies, the nominate I. p. pulcherrimus (Sclater, PL, 1853) and I. p. aureinucha (Ridgway, 1879).

== Description ==
The golden-collared honeycreeper is 11 cm (4.3 in) to 12.5 cm (4.9 in) long. It weighs 14 to 17 g (0.49 to 0.60 oz). It has a slender and slightly decurved bill. The species is sexually dimorphic. Adult males of the nominate subspecies have a black head and throat with the eponymous thin yellow-orange nuchal collar. Their mantle and scapulars are black with pale greenish straw blotches in the center of the mantle. Their lower back and most of their uppertail coverts are pale greenish straw; the rearmost coverts are black. Their wings are mostly black with rich cobalt-blue edges on the coverts and flight feathers. Their tail is mostly black with thin cobalt-blue feather edges. Their underparts are pale yellowish to greenish opal with a whitish belly. Adult females have a dull grayish olive head and a paler grayish olive back, rump, and tail. They also have a yellow-orange nuchal collar but it is inconspicuous. Their wings are grayish olive with wide bluish green edges on the coverts and flight feathers. Their underparts are dull grayish to yellowish buff with an olive tinge on the sides. Males of subspecies I. p. aureinucha have a sooty, rather than black, head and upper back, with a deeper golden nuchal collar, buffier sides and flanks, and a longer bill than the nominate. Females are essentially the same as nominate females. Both sexes of both subspecies have a red to dark red iris, a blackish maxilla, a yellow mandible, and dark gray legs and feet. Juveniles are mostly dingy brownish gray with a weak nuchal collar.

== Distribution and habitat ==
The golden-collared honeycreeper has a disjunct distribution. The subspecies' ranges are not contiguous and the nominate's range has gaps. The nominate is found in Colombia in the upper reaches of the Magdalena Valley in Huila Department. A second part of its range is on the eastern slope of Colombia's Eastern Andes from Caquetá Department south through eastern Ecuador to northern Zamora-Chinchipe Province. A third begins in southern Zamora-Chinchipe and continues on the eastern Andean slope through Peru almost to Puno Department. Subspecies I. p. aureinucha is found along the western slope of Colombia's Western Andes from Valle del Cauca Department to slightly into far northwestern Ecuador.

The golden-collared honeycreeper inhabits the interior and edges of humid to wet forest and mature secondary forest. In the forest interior it is found mostly in the canopy. In elevation it is found between 1,200 and 1,600 m (3,900 and 5,200 ft) in Colombia, below 650 m (2,100 ft) in northwestern Ecuador, and between 1,100 and 2,000 m (3,600 and 6,600 ft) in eastern Ecuador and Peru.

== Behavior ==
=== Movement ===
The golden-collared honeycreeper is mostly a year-round resident though some seasonal elevational movements have been noted in Colombia's Valle del Cauca.

=== Feeding ===
The golden-collared honeycreeper feeds primarily on berries but includes some insects in its diet. It usually forages singly or in pairs and frequently joins mixed-species feeding flocks. It moves quickly through the canopy and even at the forest edge seldom comes lower.

=== Breeding ===
The golden-collared honeycreeper's breeding season has not been defined. However, evidence suggests that in Colombia it includes at least May and June. The only known nests were built by captive individuals; they were cups. In captivity the clutch is two eggs that are paled bluish gray with rusty streaks. The female alone incubated and both parents provisioned nestlings.

=== Vocalization ===
Neither xeno-canto nor the Cornell Lab of Ornithology's Macaulay Library have recordings of the golden-collared honeycreeper's song. Xeno-canto has 10 recordings of its call and McCaulay has eight with some overlap. The species' call is "a high, lisping psee, given by both sexes, that may be elongated and rise, then fall in pitch".

== Status ==
The IUCN has assessed the golden-collared honeycreeper as being of Least Concern. It has a large range; its population size is not known and is believed to be decreasing. No immediate threats have been identified. It is considered uncommon throughout its range except in northwestern Ecuador, where there are only a few records. It occurs in several protected areas and "there is also a considerable amount of intact forest that is unprotected, but relatively secure for at least the short term".
