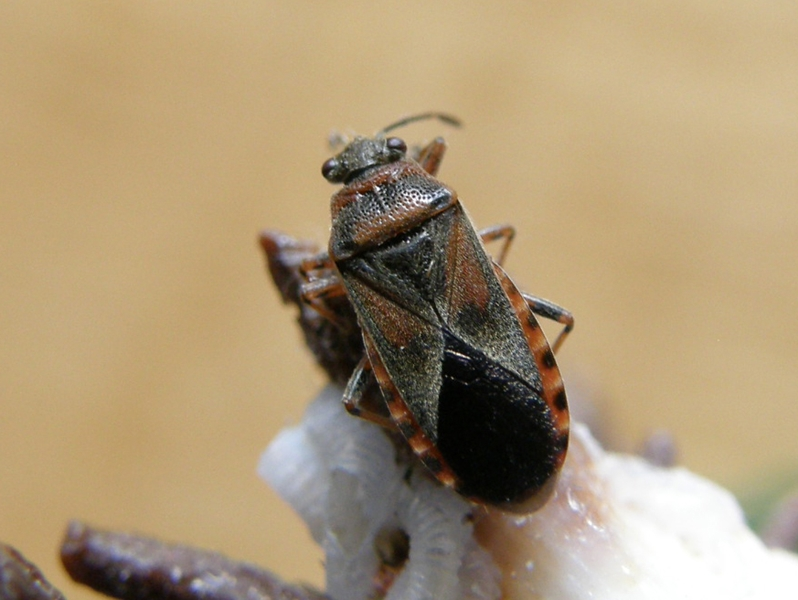

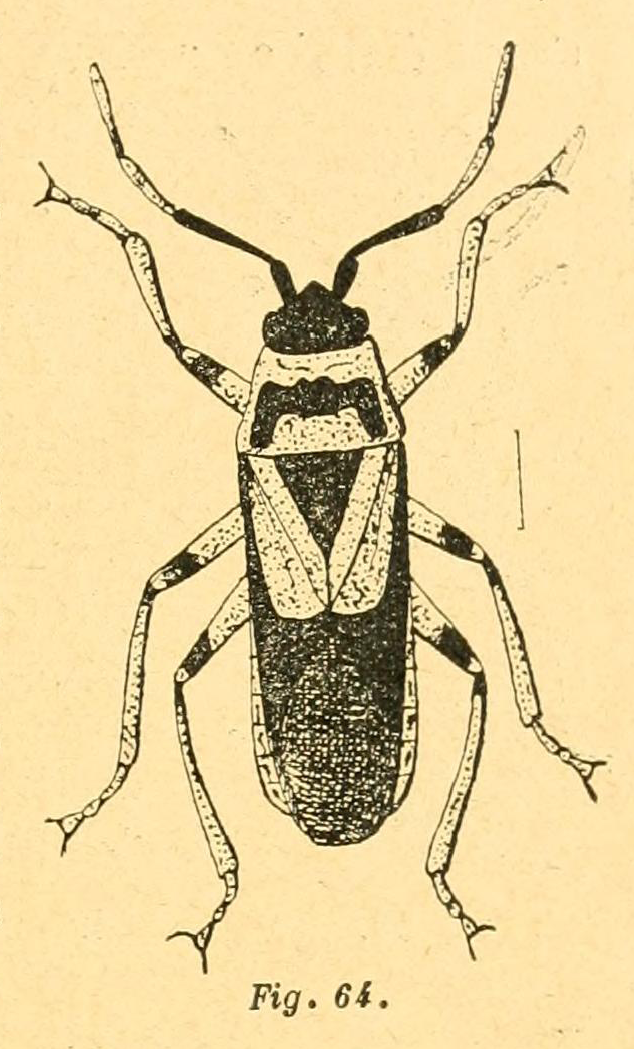
- Illustration accompanying J. Guérin and J. Péneau's 1905 redescription

Scientific classification
- Kingdom: Animalia
- Phylum: Arthropoda
- Class: Insecta
- Order: Hemiptera
- Suborder: Heteroptera
- Family: Lygaeidae
- Genus: Arocatus
- Species: A. melanocephalus

Binomial name
- Arocatus melanocephalus (Fabricius, 1798)

Synonyms
- Lygaeus melanocephalus Fabricius, 1798

= Arocatus melanocephalus =

Species of typical bugs

Arocatus melanocephalus, the elm seed bug, is a Heteroptera in the family Lygaeidae. The species was initially described by Johan Christian Fabricius in 1798, and Maximilian Spinola designated it to be the type species of the genus Arocatus in 1837. This bug is native to Europe but has been introduced to North America.

== Taxonomic history ==
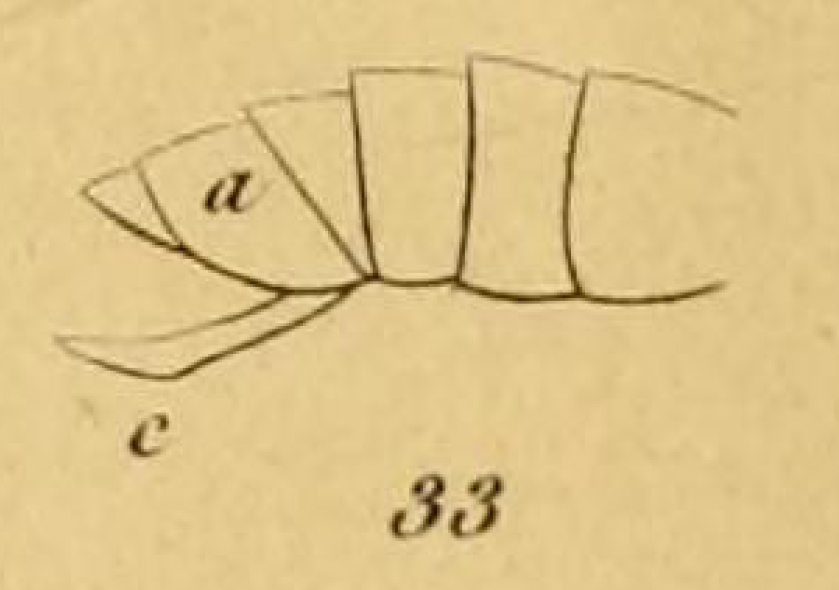
Amyot's illustration of female, showing ovipositor (c)

The Danish zoologist Johan Christian Fabricius named this species in 1798, placing it in the genus Lygaeus. When the Italian entomologist Maximilian Spinola named the genus Arocatus in 1837, he designated Fabricius's Lygaeus melanocephalus as its type species. In 1999, Jean Péricart designated a female lectotype in the University of Copenhagen Zoological Museum.

Lygaeus pruinosus, a nomen nudum referring to this species, was named by Eduard Friedrich Eversmann in 1837. Vasily Evgrafovich Yakovlev synonymized this name with A. melanocephalus in 1875. The French entomologist Charles Jean-Baptiste Amyot referred to this species as Arocatus using his system of uninonial nomenclature in a work later invalidated by the International Commission on Zoological Nomenclature.

=== Subspecies ===
As of 2017, three subspecies are recognized: the nominate subspecies A. m. melanocephalus, A. m. austerus, and A. m. melandiscus. Amyot gave the mononym Melandiscus for a specimen which Vittore Ghiliani had collected in Piedmont. In 1869, the Italian entomologist Antonio Garbiglietti designated Amyot's melandiscus as a variety of A. melanocephalus. This subspecies is found in Italy. The subspecies A. m. austerus was named by the German entomologist Wolfgang Stichel in 1957.

== Biology and description ==
Arocatus

- - - A. aenescens
    - A. rusticus
  - ★
    - A. longiceps
    - A. melanocephalus

Maximum-likelihood tree of some Arocatus species. Star denotes when the ability to sequester cardenolides was lost.

A. melanocephalus, unlike many Lygaeinae species, only stored less than 7% of the cardenolides [^{3}H]-ouabain or [^{3}H]-digoxin ten days after being fed these substances. A 2015 phylogenetic study of the subfamily Lygaeinae included four species of the genus Arocatus: A. aenescens, A. rusticus, A. rusticus, and A. melanocephalus; it placed A. melanocephalus in a clade with A. longiceps — the other Arocatus which could not store cardenolides.

It has been found on Ulmus (elm) species, Platanus orientalis (old world sycamore), Populus (poplar) species, as well as inside empty butterfly pupa covers. It has also been recorded on Quercus (oak) and Alnus (alder) species.

Adults produce a strong, unpleasant smell which is reminiscent of bitter almonds. The scent glands' openings are on the metathorax, between the second and third pairs of legs.

The body is dark red in color, and it is covered in short hairs. The head is black, and antennae are also mostly black, although on occasion the III and IV segments are partly red. The pronotum has a M-shaped spot. The underbelly is orange, and adults measure 0.33 in (8.4 mm) in length.

== Distribution ==
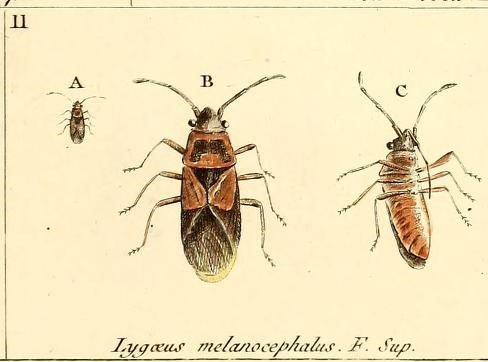
Illustration by A. J. Coquebert in 1799

Within Europe, it has been found in the countries Andorra, Austria, Belgium, Bosnia & Herzegovina, Bulgaria, Croatia, Czech Republic, France, Germany, Greece, Hungary, Italy, Moldova, Montenegro, the Netherlands, Poland, Portugal, Romania, Russia, Serbia, Slovakia, Slovenia, Spain, Switzerland, and Ukraine. However many of these central European records are quite old, dating to the late 19th and early 20th centuries; it is thought they had become rarer in Europe in the late 20th century due to Dutch elm disease killing many European elms.

Starting in 1999, A. melanocephalus has infested buildings in northern Italian cities, particularly in the regions of Emilia Romagna, Veneto, and Friuli-Venezia Giulia. These infestations occur in the summer, starting in late May or early June and ending in late September. Some Italian researchers believe this might be due to global warming, and that the insects enter buildings to escape the summer heat. The population increased in Turin in 2007, despite an increase in chemical insecticides; etofenprox is effective against this species but pyrethrum and rotenone were not. Mass occurrences also increased in Germany in the early 21st century.

In Asia, it has been found in Armenia, Azerbaijan, Georgia, Turkey, China, and Iran. They have been recorded inside buildings in Yining, Xinjiang, China.

In North America, A. melanocephalus have been found in the Canadian province of British Columbia, and the American states of Washington, Oregon, Idaho, Michigan, Utah, and Colorado. It was introduced to the Nearctic realm in the 2000s.
