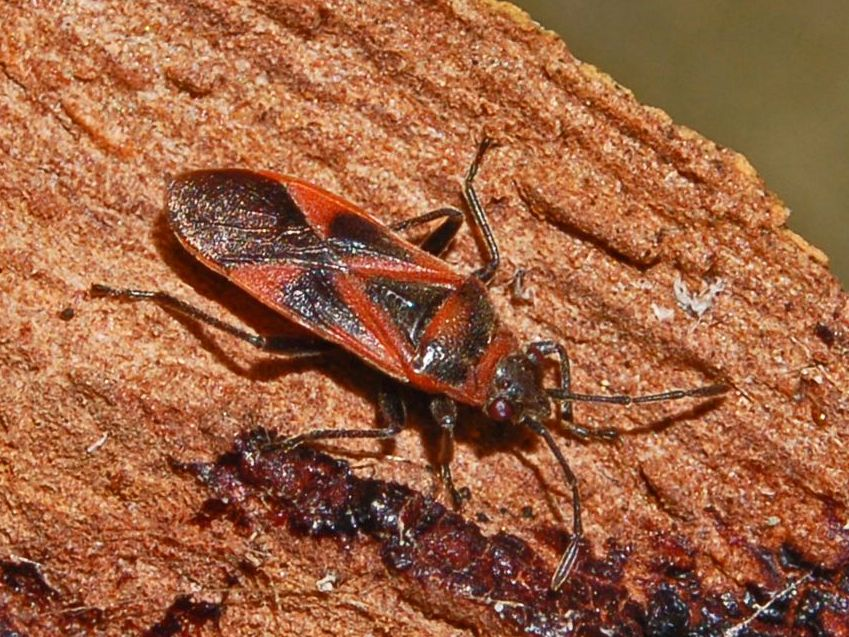
- Arocatus roeselii, upperside

Scientific classification
- Kingdom: Animalia
- Phylum: Arthropoda
- Clade: Pancrustacea
- Class: Insecta
- Order: Hemiptera
- Suborder: Heteroptera
- Family: Lygaeidae
- Genus: Arocatus
- Species: A. roeselii

Binomial name
- Arocatus roeselii (Schilling, 1829)

= Arocatus roeselii =

Species of true bug

Arocatus roeselii is a species of lygaeid bug.

== Distribution ==
This species can be found in most of Europe, in the Middle East and Caucasus.

In 2008, it was reported in large numbers in London by the Natural History Museum, London, England, but the species was later identified as a related species, Arocatus longiceps, that has a more elongated head and generally a reddish body.

== Habitat ==
These bugs preferably live under the bark of alder or sycamore.

== Description ==
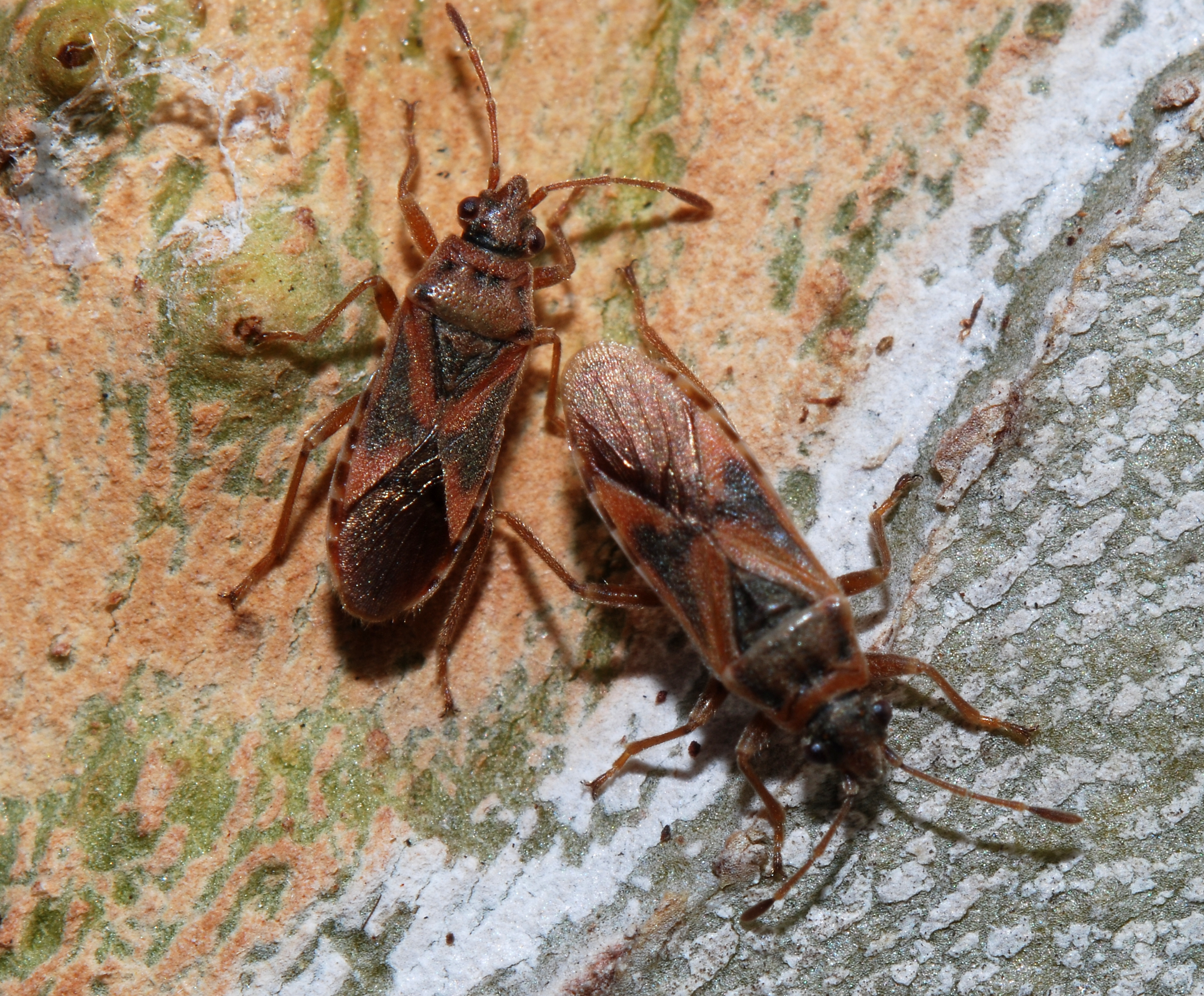
Arocatus roeselii

Arocatus roeselii can reach a length of 6–7.2 millimetres (0.24–0.28 in). This species is very variable. The upperside of these bugs is red and black, while the abdomen is orange. Head, antennae, scutellum and legs are black. Connexivum is red. Hemelytral membrane is translucent, dark brown. The head length is about the same as the distance between the eyes.

== Biology ==
Adult bugs are present all year around with several generations. They overwinter communally under bark. Mating takes place in May. The larvae develop in spring. The new generation adults at the beginning of the summer.

They feed on the seeds of Plane trees (genus Platanus), on alders (Alnus glutinosa, Alnus incana) and in other deciduous trees.
