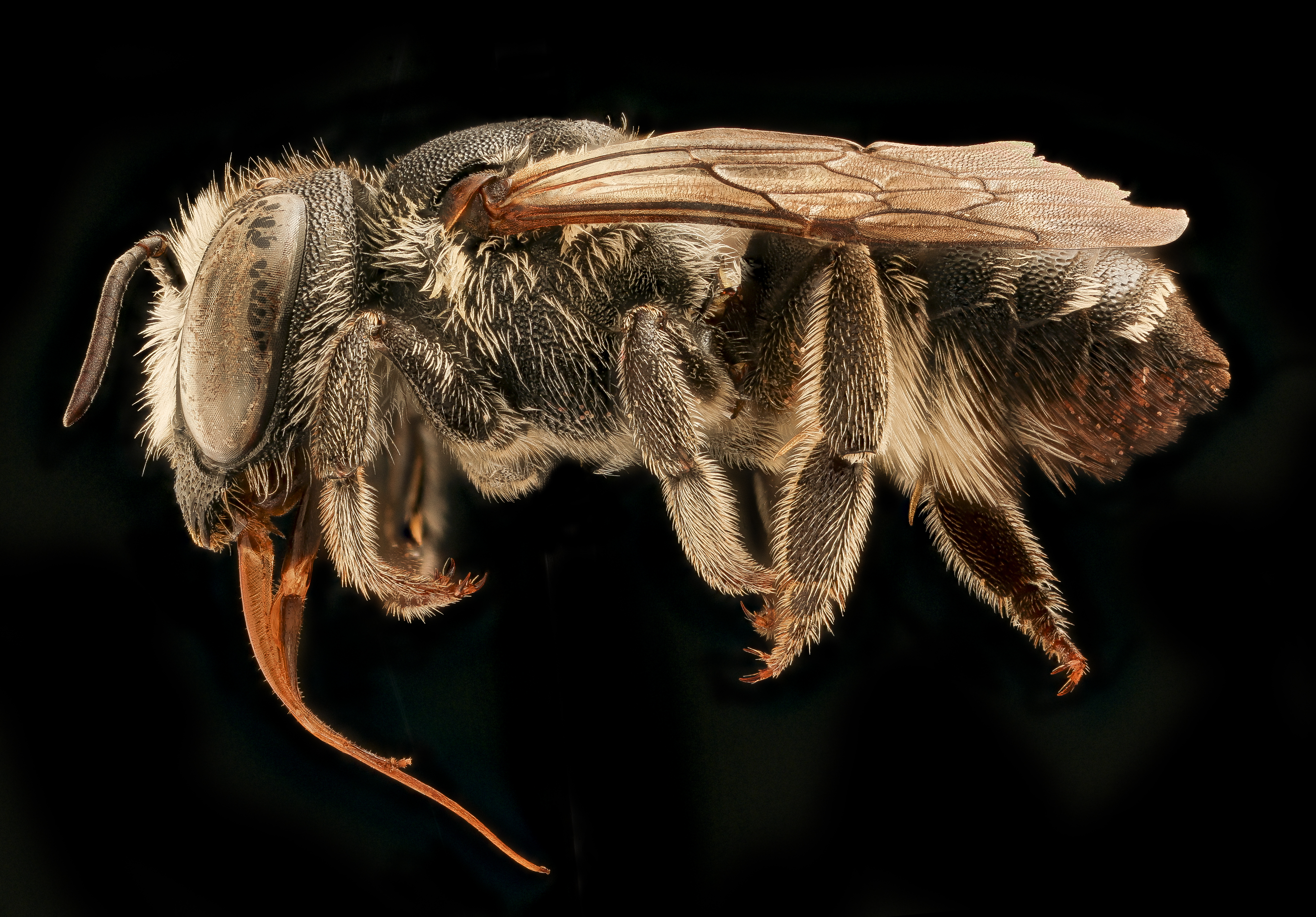

Scientific classification
- Domain: Eukaryota
- Kingdom: Animalia
- Phylum: Arthropoda
- Class: Insecta
- Order: Hymenoptera
- Family: Megachilidae
- Genus: Megachile
- Species: M. apicalis

Binomial name
- Megachile apicalis Spinola, 1808

= Megachile apicalis =

Species of leafcutter bee (Megachile)

Megachile apicalis is a species of bee in the family Megachilidae. It was described by Spinola in 1808. It is commonly observed in Europe and the Mediterranean region, but instances have been reported in North America.
