= Megachile nigripes =

Scientific classification
- Domain: Eukaryota
- Kingdom: Animalia
- Phylum: Arthropoda
- Class: Insecta
- Order: Hymenoptera
- Family: Megachilidae
- Genus: Megachile
- Species: M. nigripes

Binomial name
- Megachile nigripes Spinola, 1838

Species of leafcutter bee (Megachile)

Megachile nigripes is a species of bee in the family Megachilidae. It was described by Maximilian Spinola in 1838.
