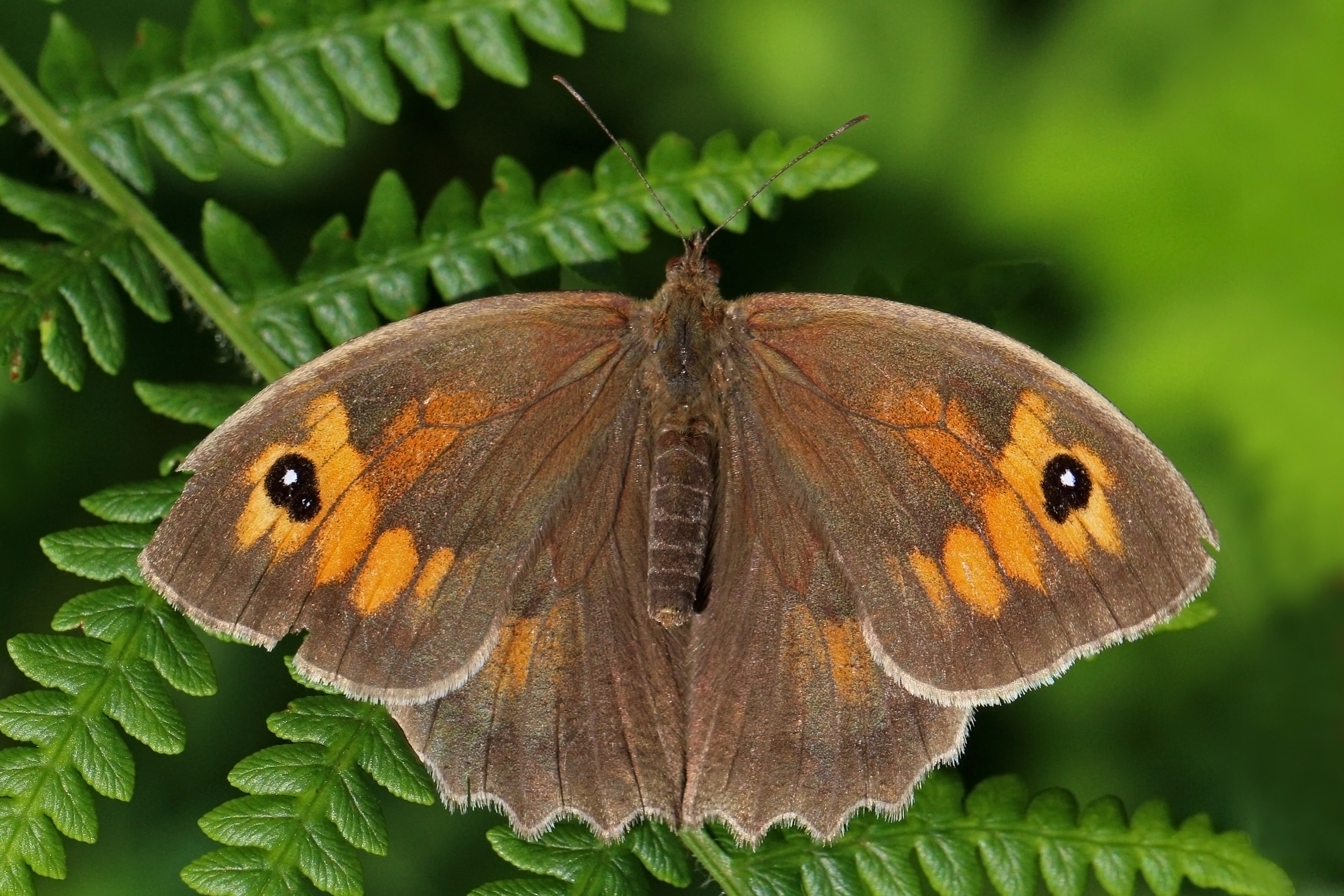

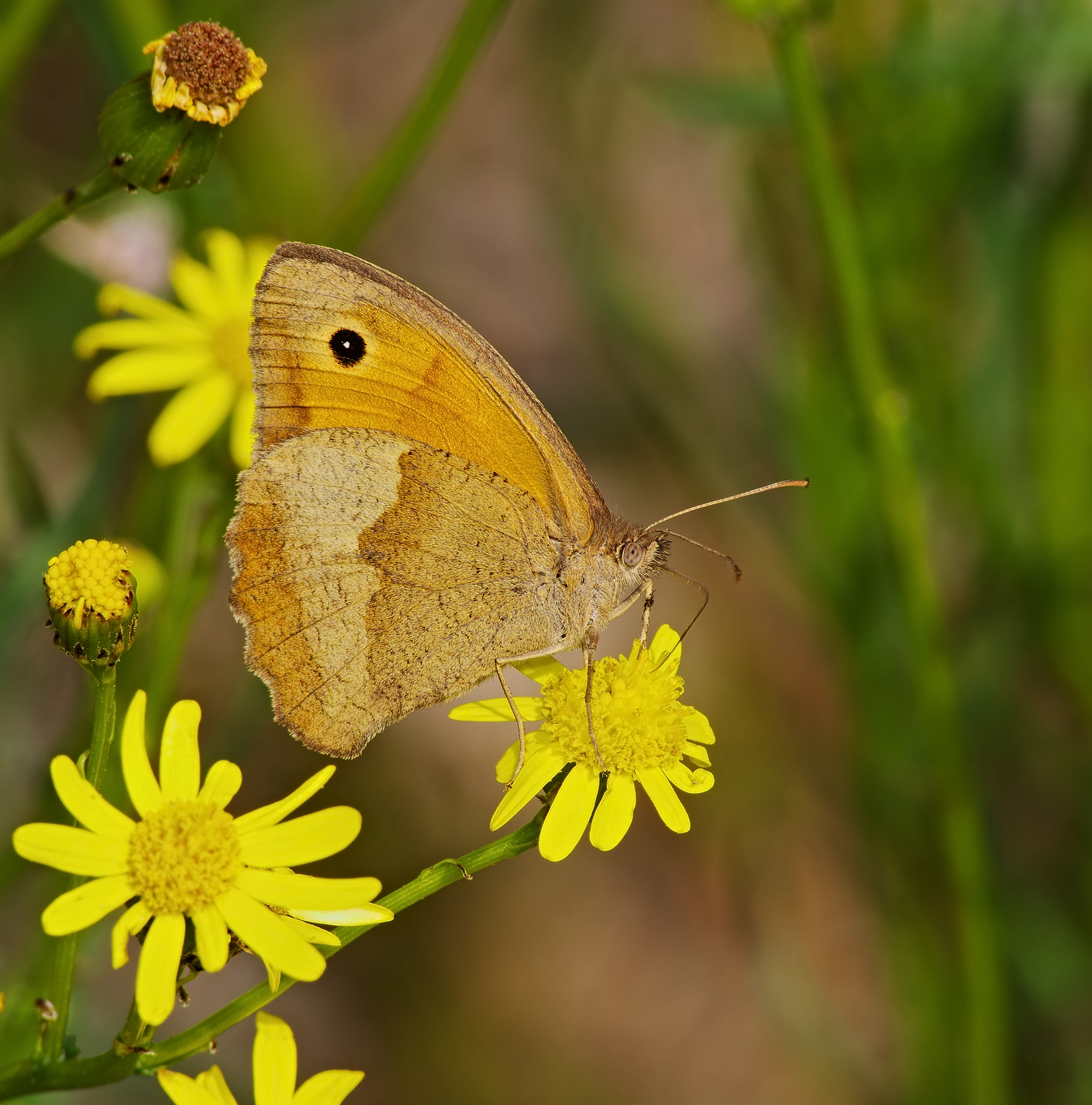
- Both females

Conservation status
- Least Concern (IUCN 3.1)

Scientific classification
- Kingdom: Animalia
- Phylum: Arthropoda
- Clade: Pancrustacea
- Class: Insecta
- Order: Lepidoptera
- Family: Nymphalidae
- Genus: Maniola
- Species: M. jurtina

Binomial name
- Maniola jurtina (Linnaeus, 1758)

= Meadow brown =

Species of butterfly

The meadow brown (Maniola jurtina) is a butterfly found in the Palearctic realm. Its range includes Europe south of 62°N, Russia eastwards to the Urals, Asia Minor, Iraq, Iran, North Africa and the Canary Islands. The larvae feed on grasses.

== Description ==
There is marked sexual dimorphism in this species. The upperside of the male is uniformly light brown with a black ocellus centered white at the apex of the forewing, while the female has a tawny patch more or less extended around this ocella. The underside forewing is ochre-colored bordered with dark beige with the same ocelli at the apex in the male, while the hindwing is greyish to brown with a more or less orange band in the female. The males are also much more active and range far about, while females fly less and often may not move away from the area where they grew up.

== Description in Seitz ==
Above dark brown: the apical ocellus minutely centred with white, being in the male bordered with dull dark yellow, and standing in the female in an ochre-yellow half band, which becomes narrower behind and does not reach the hindmargin. The upperside of the live male has often a splendid metallic gloss and bears a broad scent-patch below the cell. Underside of hindwing in the male dark brown, with a hardly perceptible middle band, in the female grey-brown, with a broad, pale, proximally golden-brown-bordered curved band. In several forms throughout Europe Apart from the forms characterized by the disappearance of ocelli or the appearance of accessory there are firstly the albinos which have received in which the blackish ground-colour is replaced by dirty white, while the reddish yellow halfband has remained as such. In others the reddish yellow halfband on the forewing of the female is pale to ivory-white. Specimens have been described in which the band of the male is very prominent on a silky dust-grey upperside. Aberration cinerea has a bluish gloss on the dark upperside; the hindwing is strongly dentate, tinged with pink on the underside, and bears two eye-dots In hot summers one not seldom meets with specimens in which the reddish yellow colour has increased, this colour being represented by a yellowish red dusting on the apical area in the male and in the female by a yellowish red area in the disc of the hindwing.[Subspecies] hispulla Hbn. (47b) from Southern Europe, has these characteristics in a still more pronounced degree, and is, besides, generally broader-winged than the nymotypical jurtina — fortunata Alph. (47 c) is a yet paler form. The live male has in its apical area a magnificent golden gloss on a deep black ground, in the female the ground-colour above is reduced by the extension of the reddish yellow. Moreover, the form is much larger and the basal area of the hindwing is so darkened below that the light discal band contrasts vividly.

A variable number of smaller eyespots are usually found on the hindwing undersides. These may number up to twelve per butterfly, with up to six on each wing, but sometimes none. The factors that govern polymorphism in this trait are not resolved, although a number of theories have been proposed (Stevens 2005). On the other hand, the evolutionary significance of the upperwing eyespots is more obvious: The more active males have a markedly more cryptic upperside pattern, whereas the females have more opportunity to present their eyespots in a sudden display of colors and patterns that presumably startle predators so the butterfly has a better chance of escaping. Some specimens are bi-pupilled.

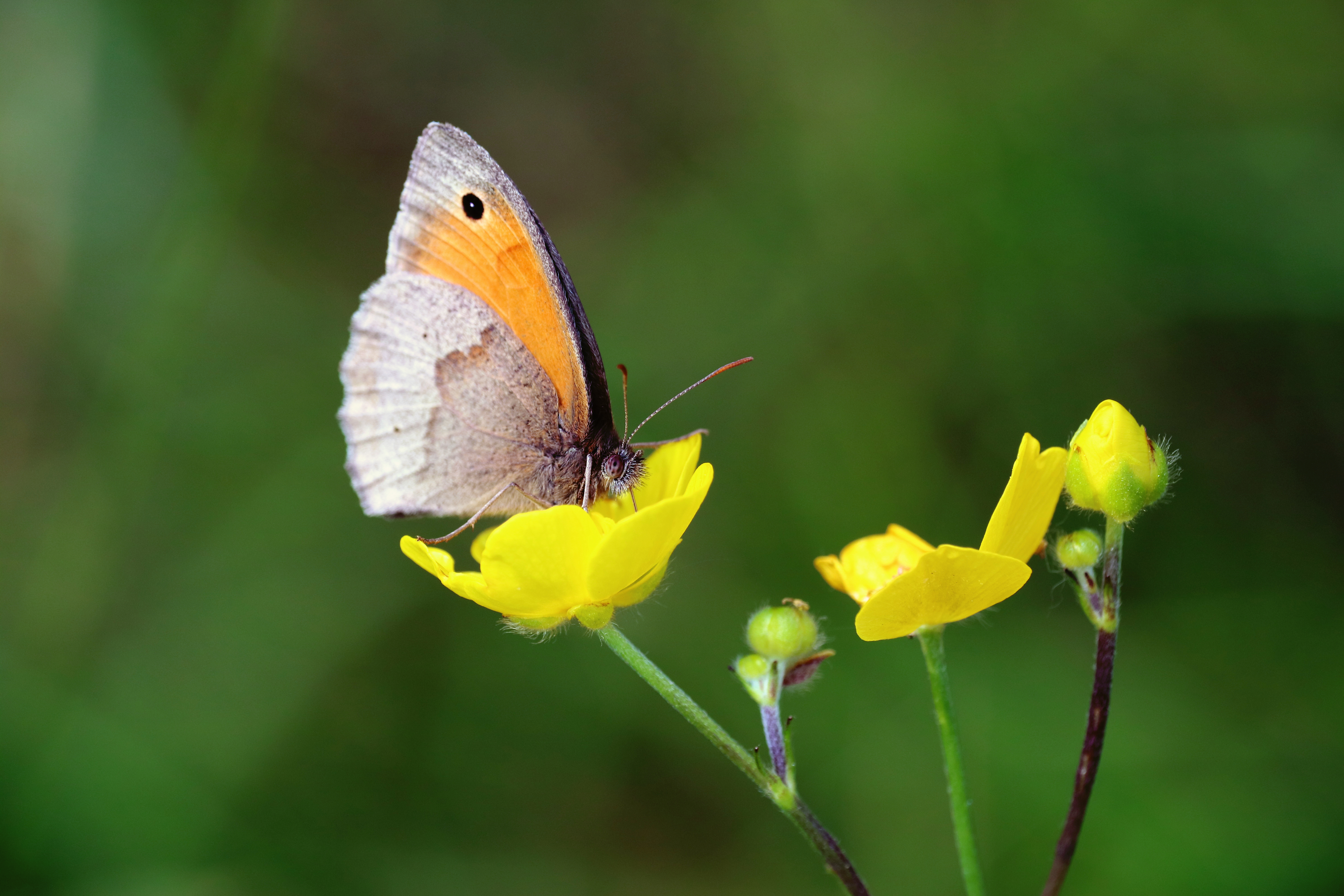
Maniola jurtina female on buttercup flower.

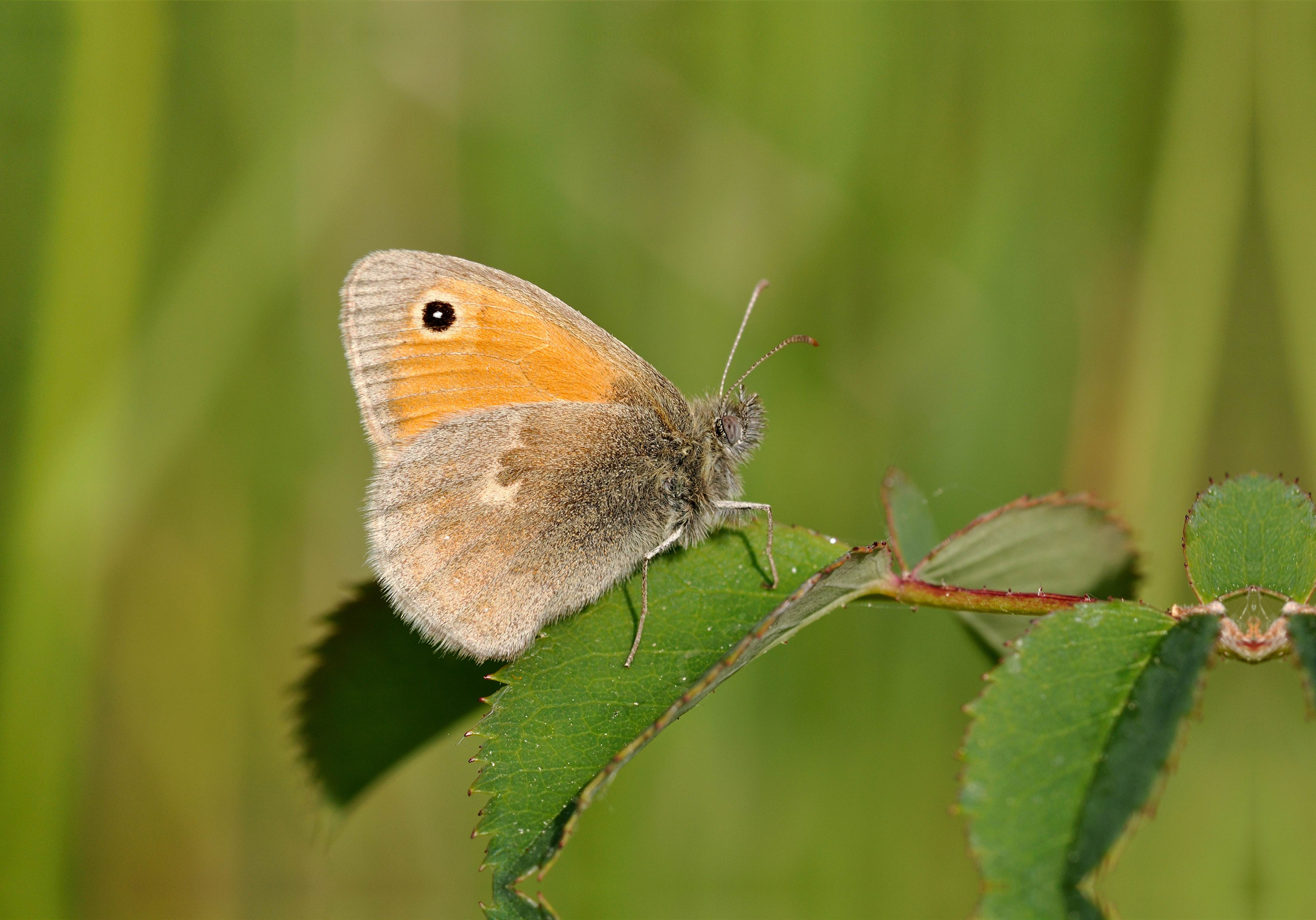
Small heath (for comparison)

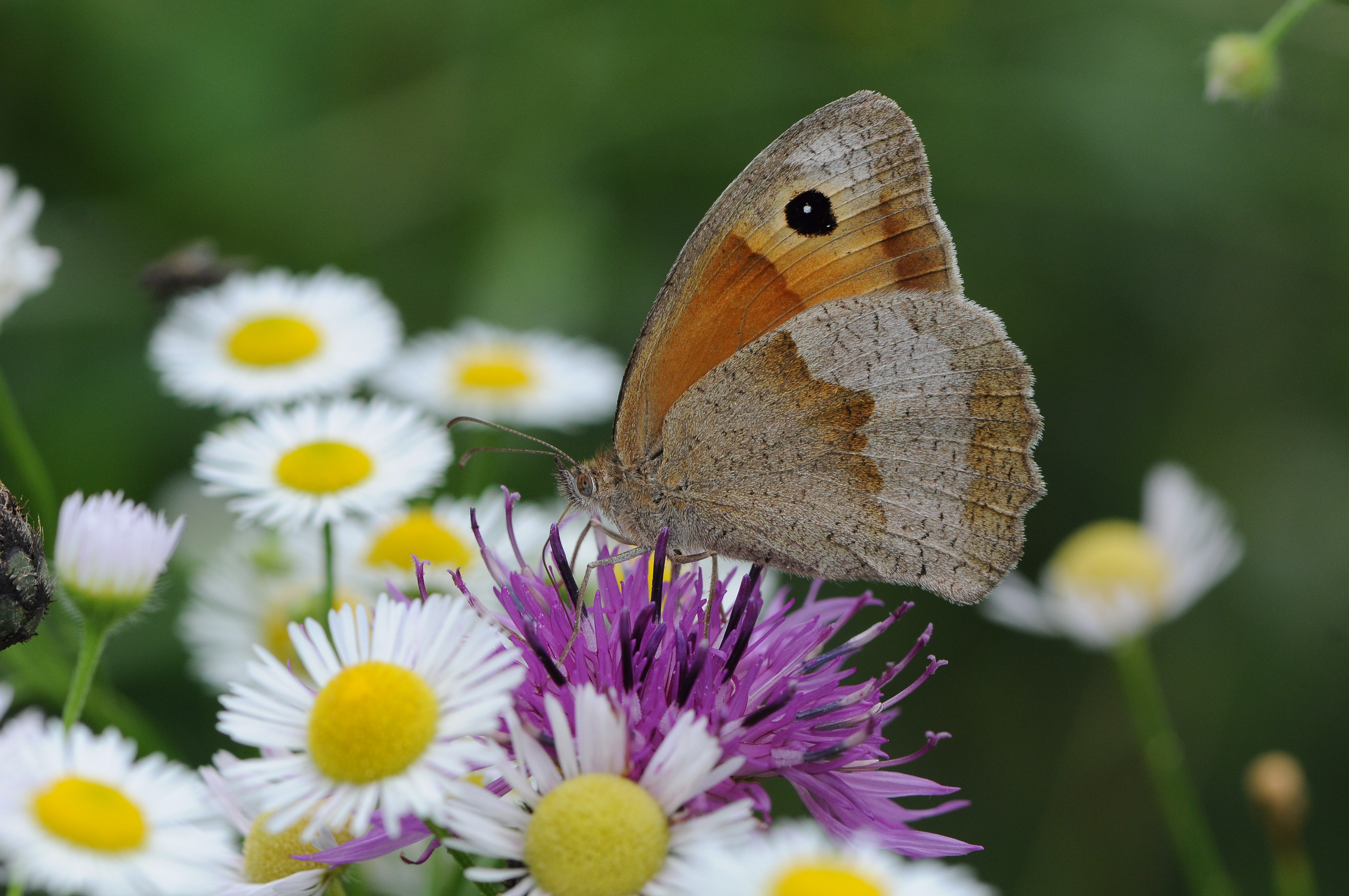
Female

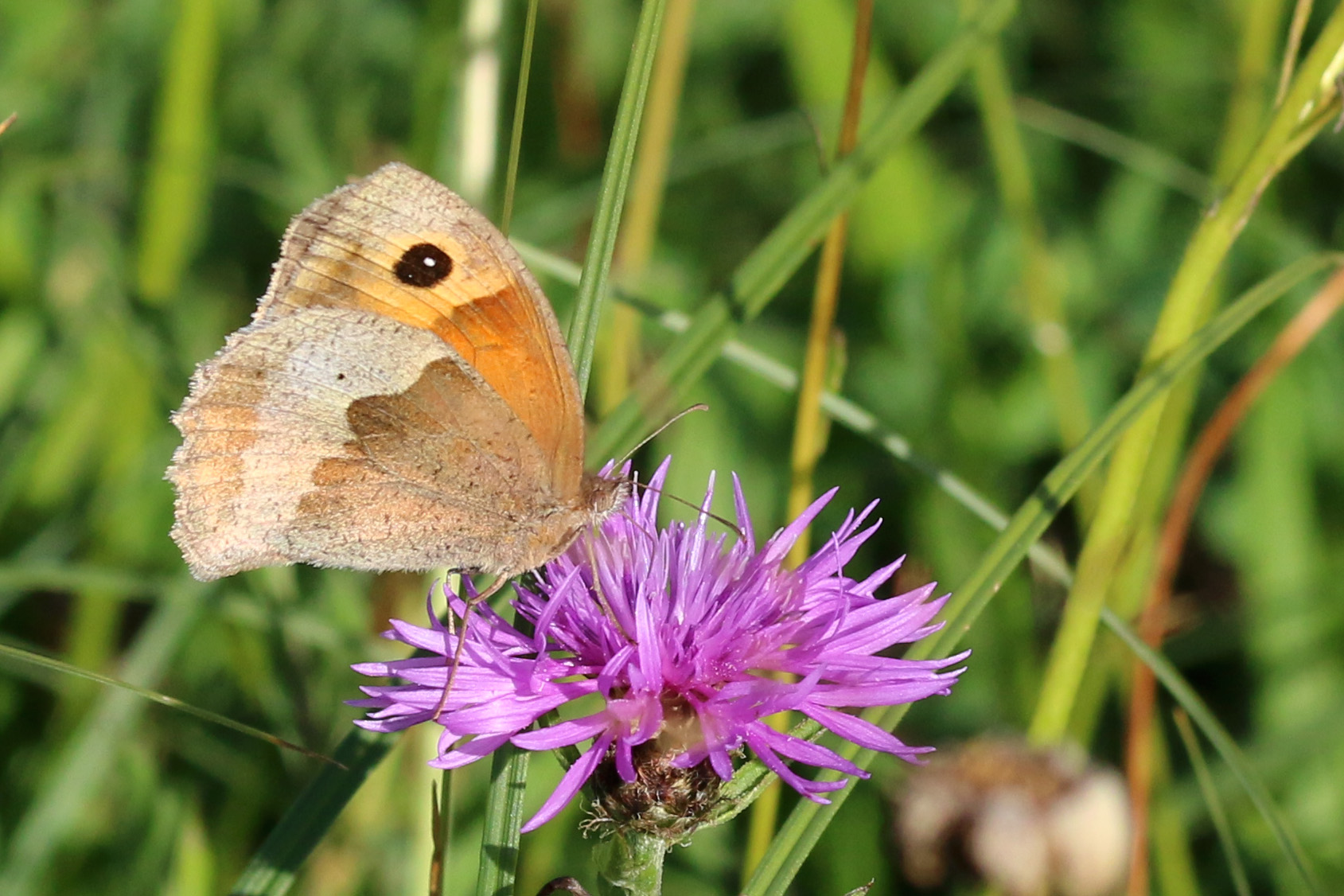
Female

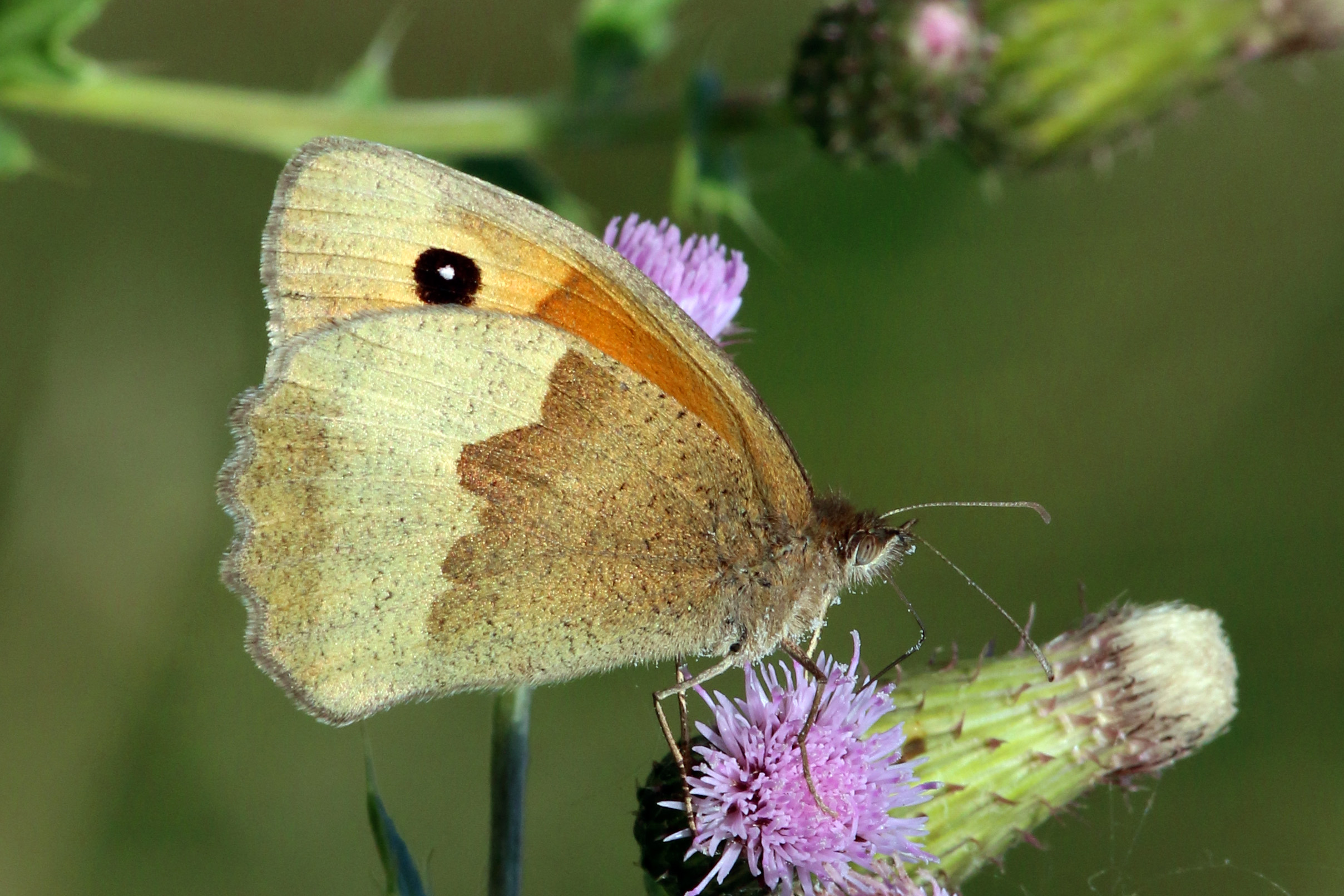
Female

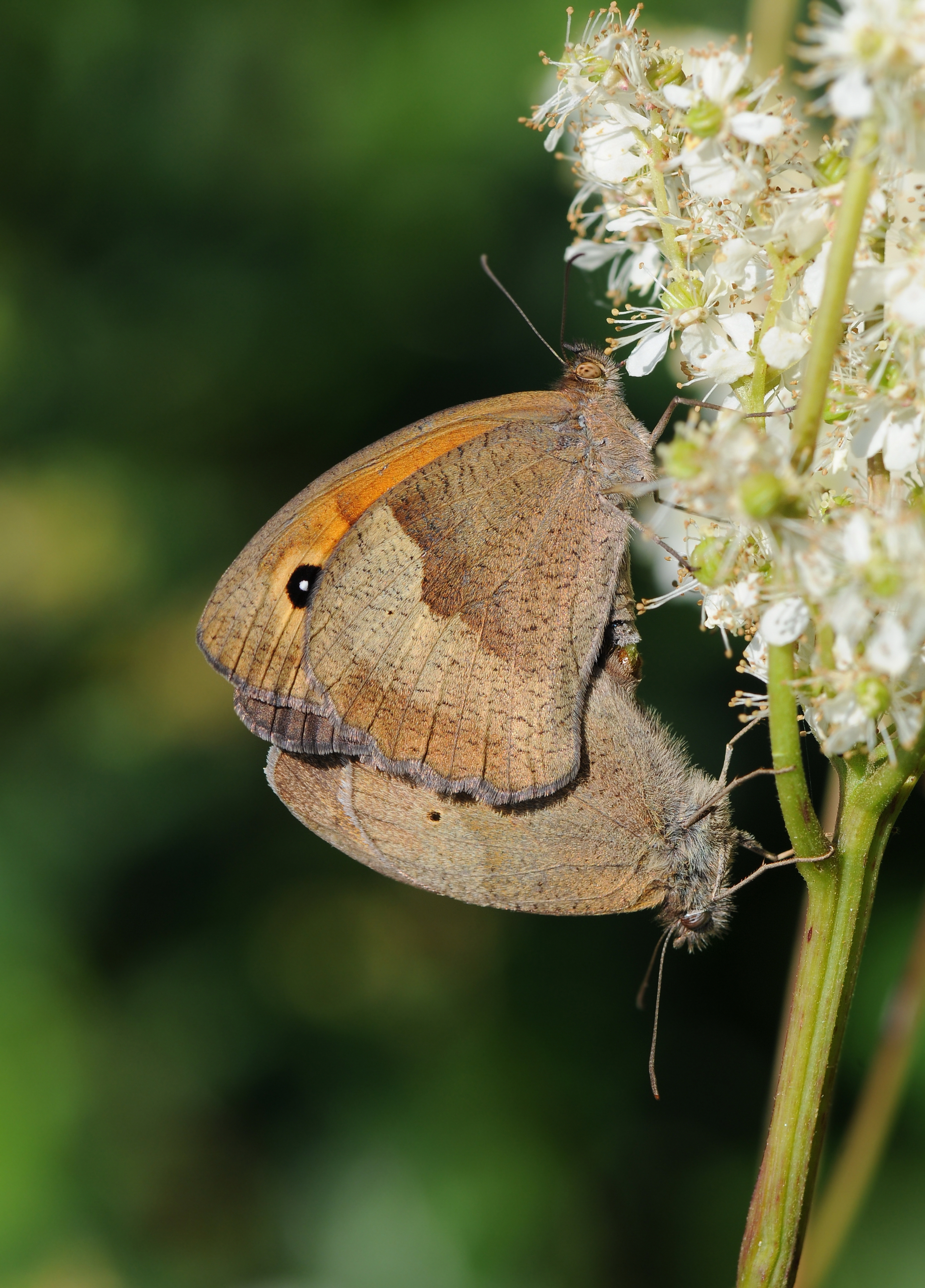
Mating

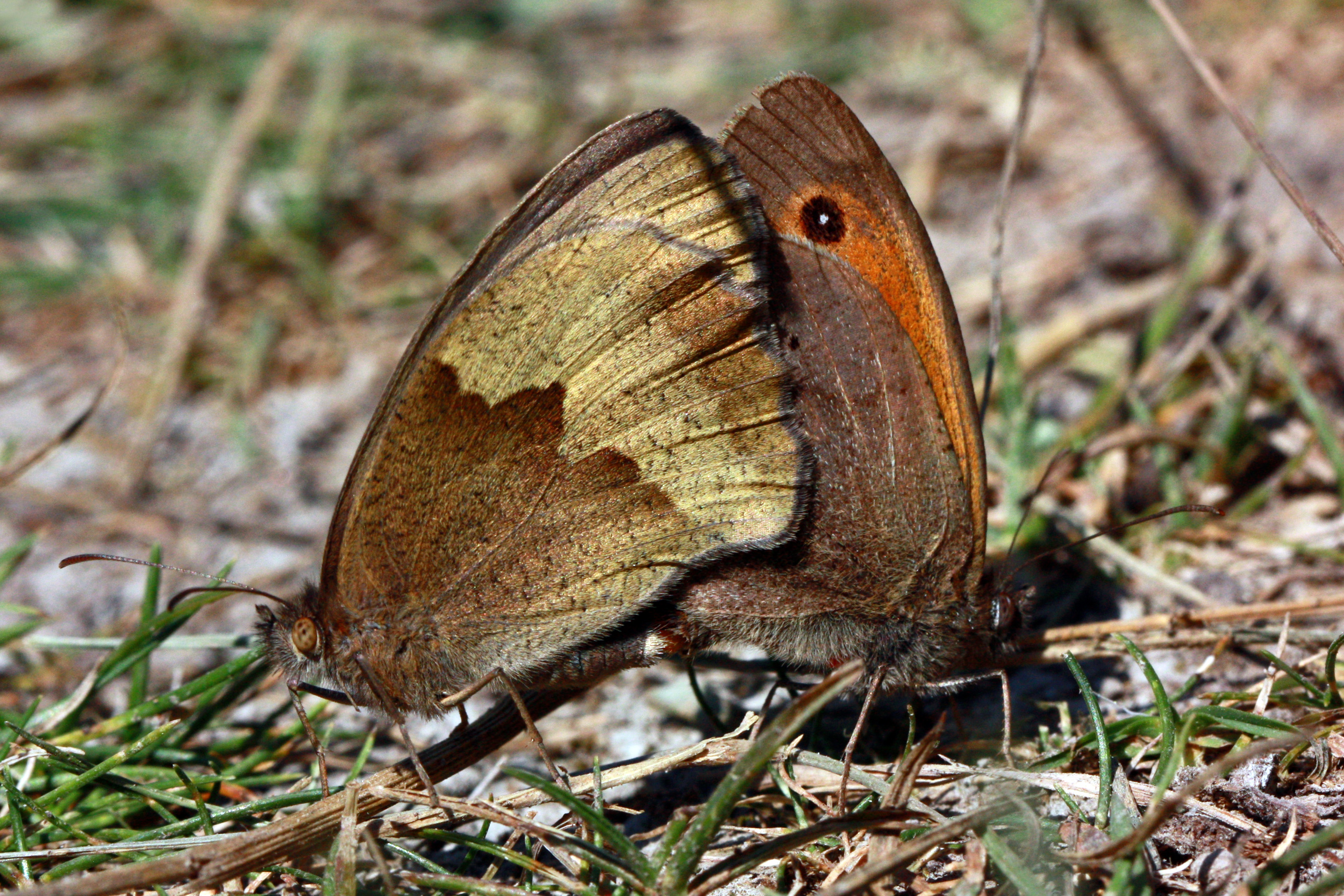
Mating

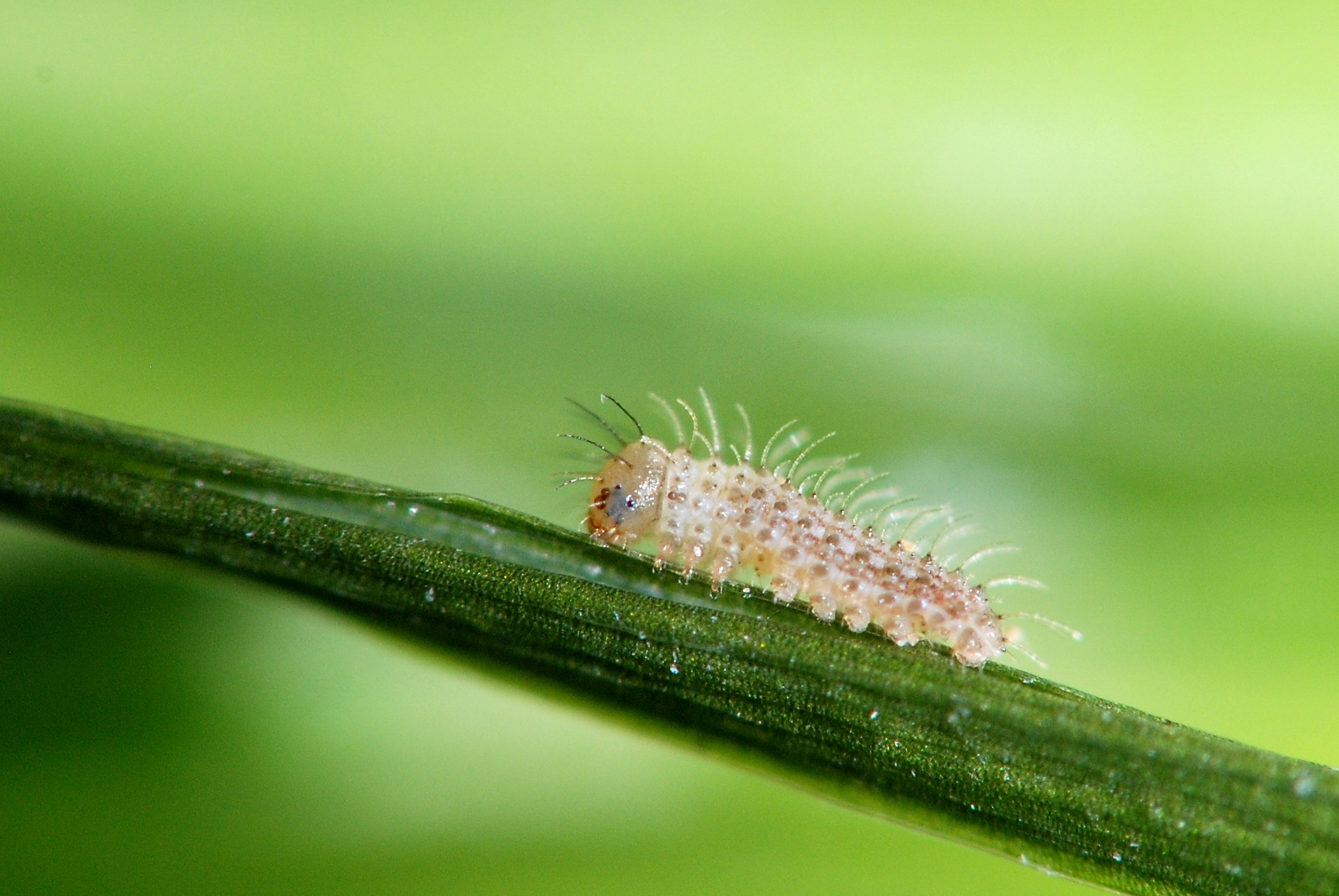
First instar caterpillar

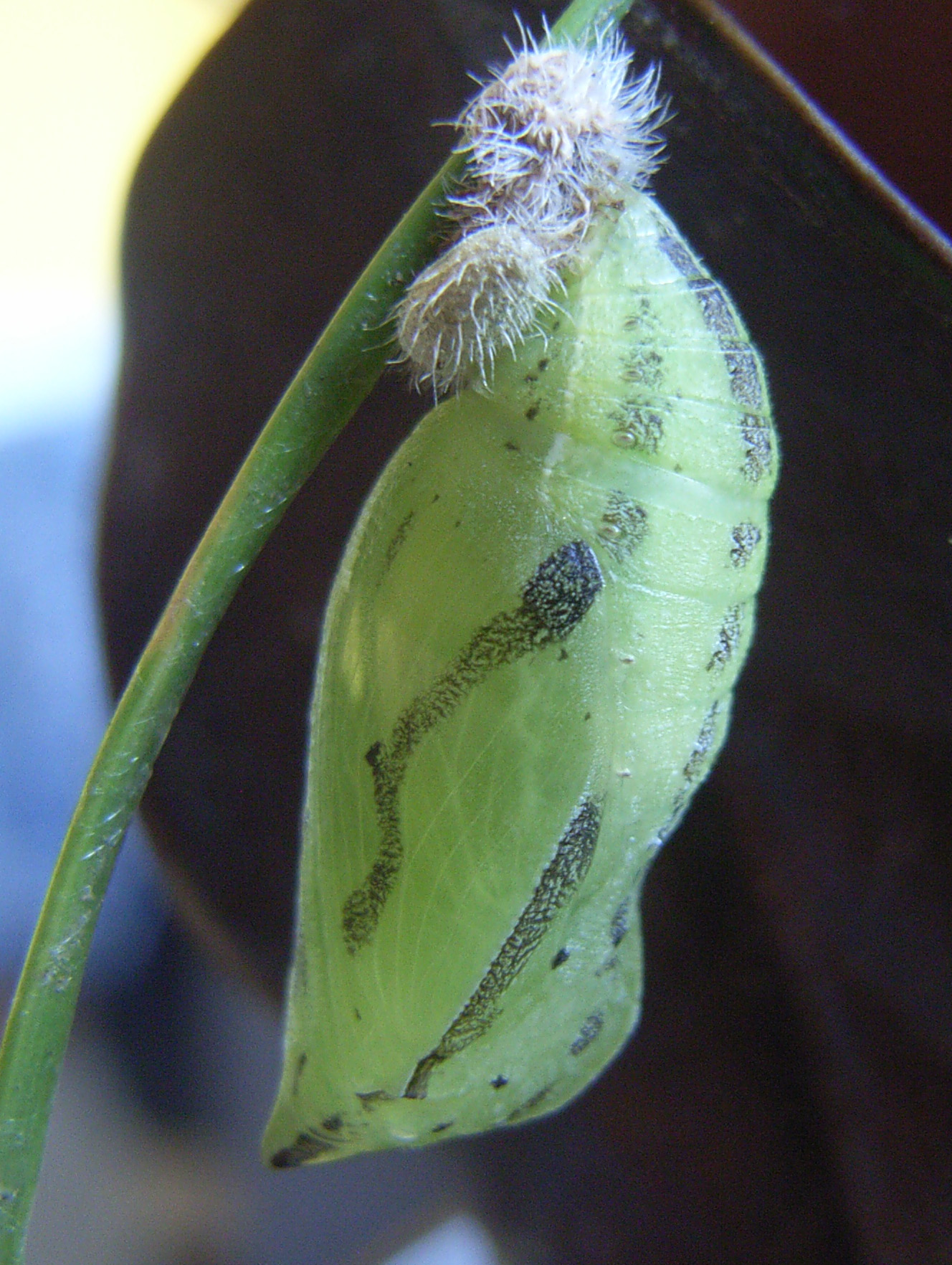
Pupa

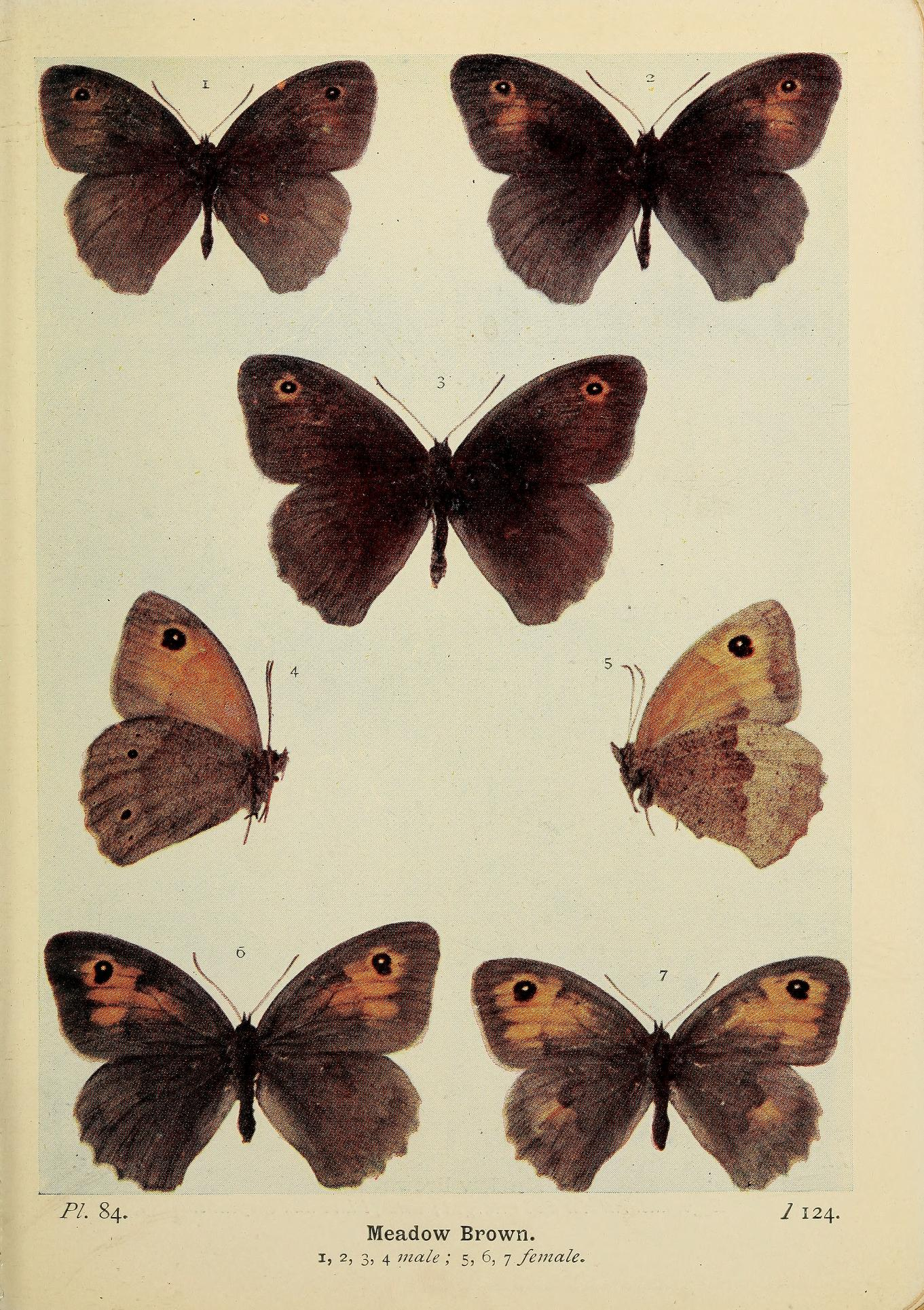
Figures 1–4 male and 5–7 female

== Similar species ==
Similar species are the gatekeeper (which prefers to rest with its wings open) and the small heath (which is smaller). More similar are the dusky meadow brown (Hyponephele lycaon smaller, male androconial area obliquely directed and divided into three parts by veins Cu1 and Cu2, female with two ochreous ringed eye-spots) is otherwise very similar, Pyronia janiroides, Hyponephele moroccana, Hyponephele lycaon and Hyponephele lupina. Most problematic is the cryptic species complex of Maniola (Maniola telmessia, Maniola nurag, Maniola chia, Maniola halicarnassus and Maniola cypricola).

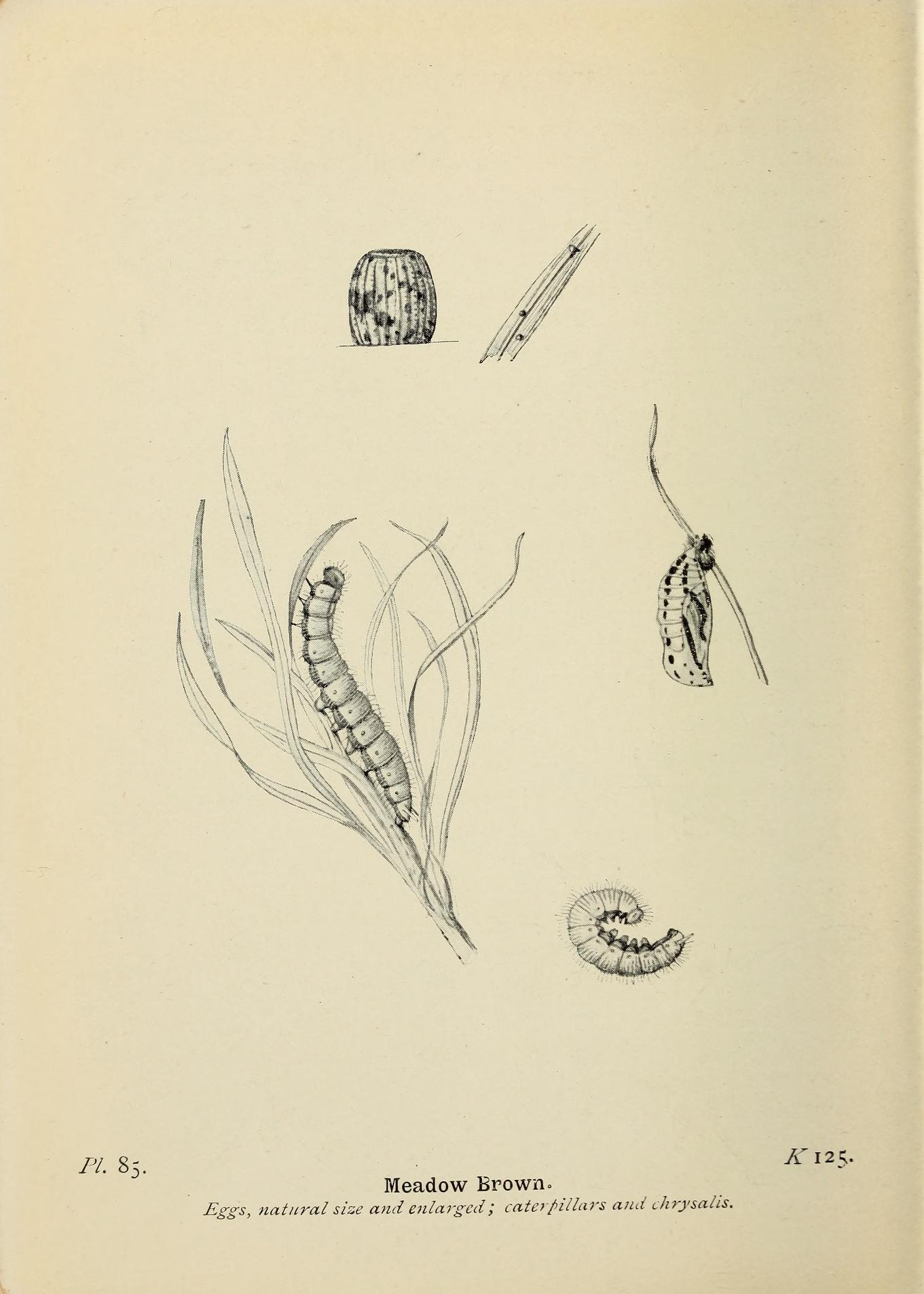
Plate 85

== Description of egg, larva and pupa ==
The egg, laid on a blade of grass as shown (Plate 85), is upright and ribbed; the top is flattened, with an impressed ring thereon. Color, whitish green inclining to brownish yellow as it matures, and marked with purplish brown. The caterpillar is bright green, clothed with short whitish hairs; there is a darker line down the back, and a diffused white stripe on each side above the reddish spiracles; the anal points are white. Head rather darker green, hairy. The chrysalis is pale green, marked with brownish on the wing covers, the thorax is spotted with blackish, and the points on the body are brownish. Suspended, and with the old skin attached. (South, 1906).

== Food plants ==
Recorded larval food plants include rough meadow grass (Poa trivialis), smooth meadow grass (Poa pratensis), Festuca species, bents (Agrostis species), and cock's-foot (Dactylis glomerata), false brome (Brachypodium sylvaticum), downy oat-grass and Helictotrichon pubescens. Less specific records of Poa, Bromus, Festuca, Milium, Brachypodium, Lolium, Avena, Alopecurus and Anthoxanthum.

Adults feed on nectar from a wide spectrum of plants including Centaurea, Cirsium, Leontodon, Erica, Rubus, Heracleum, Eupatorium, (sensu lato) Origanum, Senecio, Scabiosa, Succisa, Ligustrum and Filipendula.

== Flight time ==
The meadow brown is univoltine (one generation per year) and adults emerge over a long period (spring, summer and autumn). Some individuals have a short larval development time and produce late adults. This is genetically controlled.

== Habitat ==
One of the habitats for Maniola jurtina

Because of the vast distribution habitats are hard to define but broadly are forest edge, forest-steppe and meadow steppe habitats up to 2,000 m above sea level, cultivated lands (meadow, forest plantations, parks and orchards).

== Subspecies ==
- Maniola jurtina hispulla (Esper, 1805) Portugal, Spain
- Maniola jurtina hyperhispulla (Thomson, 1973) Maltese Archipelago (Gozo)
- Maniola jurtina jurtina (Linnaeus, 1758) Europe (type locality Sweden), Spain
- Maniola jurtina janira Linnaeus, 1758 central Europe, Russia, Latvia, Poland, Slovakia, Hungary, Ukraine, middle and southern Urals, Kazakhstan, western Siberia (Kurgan)
- Maniola jurtina strandiana Oberthür, 1936 south Europe, Caucasus Major and Minor Crimea, Armenia, Azerbaijan
- Maniola jurtina persica LeCerf, 1912 (=? ghilanica LeCerf, 1913) Kopet-Dagh, Azerbaijan, Turkmenistan
- Maniola jurtina phormia (Fruhstorfer, 1909) Slovenia
