= Cercoptera =

Scientific classification
- Domain: Eukaryota
- Kingdom: Animalia
- Phylum: Arthropoda
- Class: Insecta
- Order: Coleoptera
- Suborder: Polyphaga
- Infraorder: Cucujiformia
- Family: Cerambycidae
- Subfamily: Cerambycinae
- Tribe: Trachyderini
- Genus: Cercoptera; Spinola, 1839

Genus of beetles

Cercoptera is a genus of beetles in the family Cerambycidae, containing the following species:

- Cercoptera banonii Spinola, 1839
- Cercoptera sanguinicollis Gounelle, 1911
