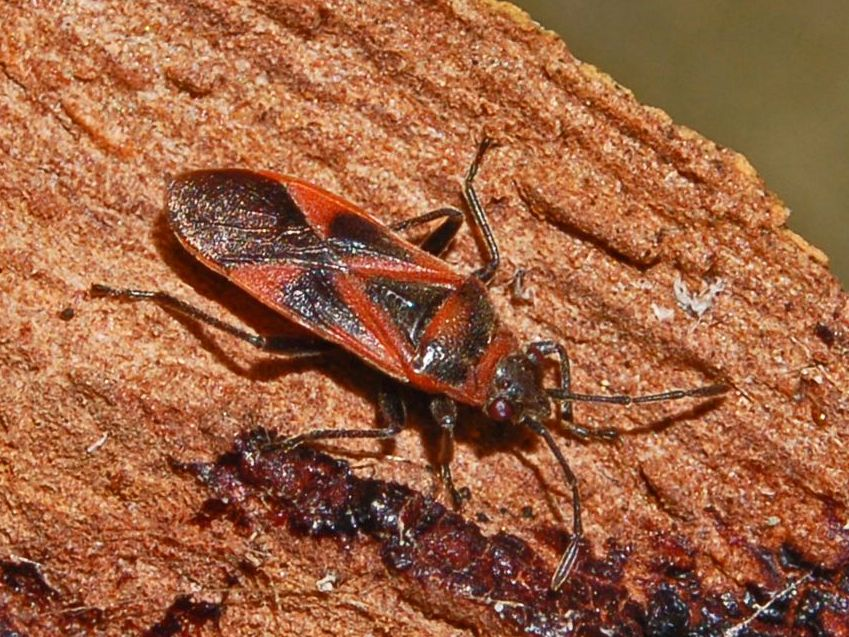
- Arocatus roeselii

Scientific classification
- Domain: Eukaryota
- Kingdom: Animalia
- Phylum: Arthropoda
- Class: Insecta
- Order: Hemiptera
- Suborder: Heteroptera
- Family: Lygaeidae
- Genus: Arocatus; Spinola, 1837

Type species
- Lygaeus melanocephalus Fabricius, 1798

Synonyms
- Tetralaccus Fieber, 1860; Microcaenocoris Breddin, 1900

= Arocatus =

Genus of true bugs

Arocatus is a genus of bugs in the family Lygaeidae.

== Species ==
Species within this genus include:

Arocatus aenescens Stål, 1874
Arocatus chiasmus Slater Alex, 1985
Arocatus elengantulus Tsai & Rédei, 2017
Arocatus fastosus Slater Alex, 1985
Arocatus longicephalus Slater, 1972
Arocatus longiceps Stål, 1872
Arocatus melanocephalus (Fabricius, 1798)
Arocatus melanostoma Scott, 1874
Arocatus montanus Slater Alex, 1985
Arocatus nanus (Breddin, 1900)
Arocatus nicobarensis (Mayr, 1865)
Arocatus pilosulus Distant, 1879
Arocatus pseudosericans Gao, Kondorosy & Bu, 2013
Arocatus roeselii (Schilling, 1829)
Arocatus rubromarginatus (Distant, 1920)
Arocatus rufipes Stål, 1872
Arocatus rusticus (Stål, 1867)
Arocatus sericans (Stål, 1859)
Arocatus suboeneus Montandon, 1893
