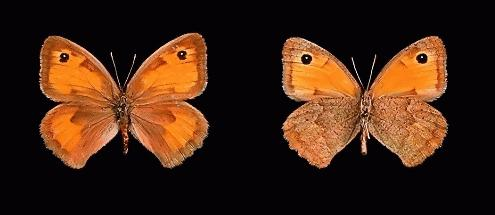

Scientific classification
- Domain: Eukaryota
- Kingdom: Animalia
- Phylum: Arthropoda
- Class: Insecta
- Order: Lepidoptera
- Family: Nymphalidae
- Genus: Maniola
- Species: M. nurag

Binomial name
- Maniola nurag Ghiliani, 1852

= Sardinian meadow brown =

Species of butterfly

The Sardinian meadow brown (Maniola nurag) is a butterfly belonging to the family Nymphalidae. It is a small butterfly with orange and brown colouring. The butterfly is only found in Sardinia. Seitz describes it thus E. nurag Ghil. (47 c). Considerably smaller than the jurtina-forms, otherwise closely allied to them. Both sexes with an ochre-yellow distal band, which in the male is sometimes reduced to an interrupted half-band of the forewing, but usually, as always in the female, continues through both the wings; the ground colour a very pale brown. The underside of the hindwing greyish brown, with a sometimes obsolete, mostly but slightly prominent median band. — In Sardinia and Corsica, in June and July, very local, apparently only flying in localities of a certain definite character which are covered with hard grasses.
