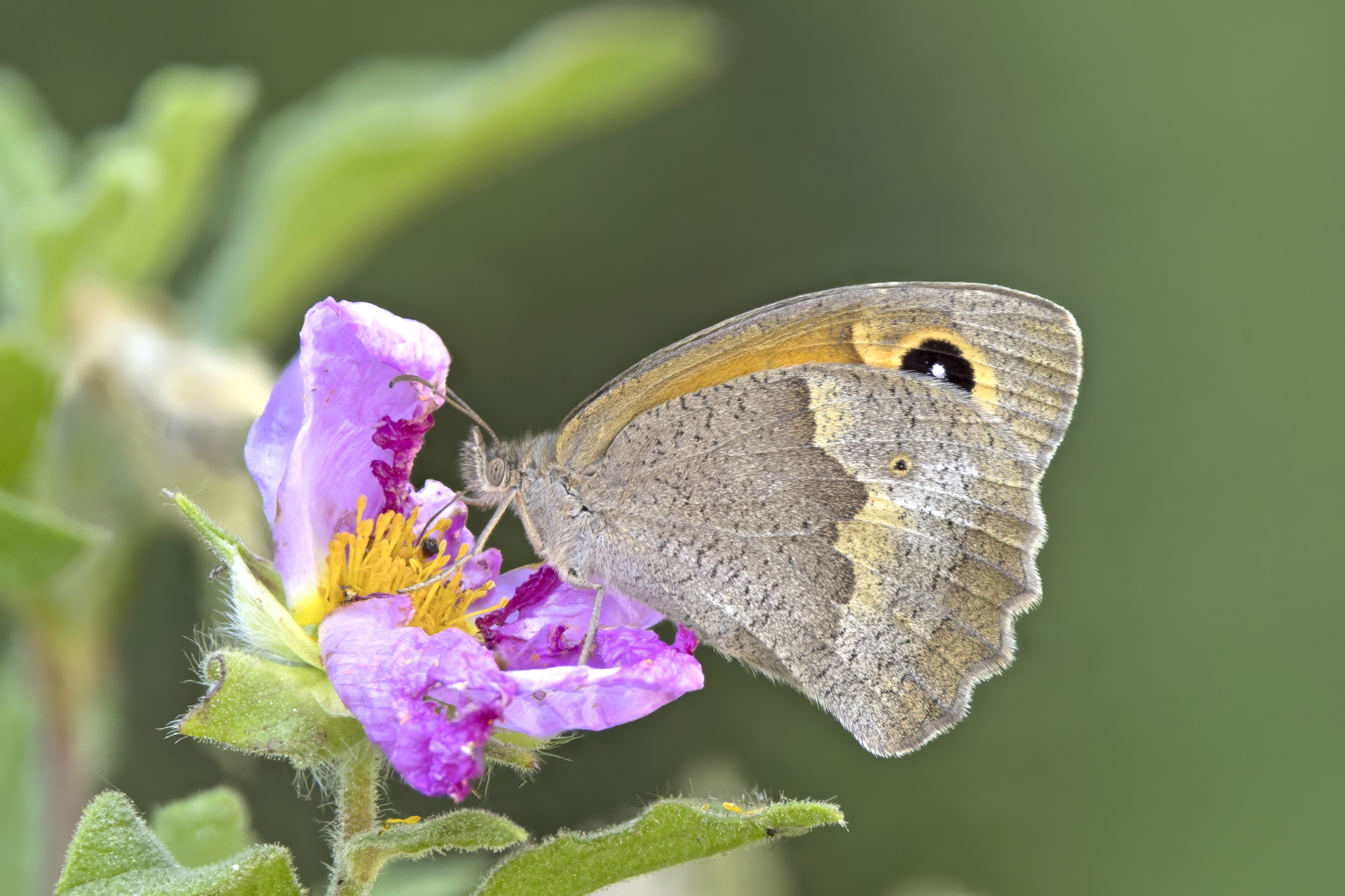

Scientific classification
- Kingdom: Animalia
- Phylum: Arthropoda
- Class: Insecta
- Order: Lepidoptera
- Family: Nymphalidae
- Genus: Maniola
- Species: M. telmessia

Binomial name
- Maniola telmessia (Zeller, 1847)

Synonyms
- Hipparchia telmessia Zeller, 1847

= Maniola telmessia =

Species of butterfly

Maniola telmessia, the Turkish meadow brown, is a butterfly of the family Nymphalidae. It is found on several Greek islands in the Aegean Sea and from there through Asia Minor to south-western Iran. It is described as a common species in Israel. In Turkey its distribution was observed in the regions of Aegean, southern Anatolia (Antalya to Kahramanmaraş) and southeastern Anatolia.

Adults are on wing from April to October in one generation per year. In hot summers, adults diapause. Mating takes place before this diapause, but the eggs are laid after, in September to October. When resting, adults often hide the "eyes" of the forewings under the camouflage colours of the underside of the hindwings. If disturbed, they lift the front wings abruptly or take off and fly elsewhere.

The egg is conical, with a rounded apex, vertical ridges and horizontal grooves. The caterpillars are green, with a lighter green line along their sides; their bodies being covered in short, greenish hairs; they reach up to 30mm in length and around 5mm in width. At the end of the body, caterpillars have a forked tail. They are particularly active at night, hiding during the day amongst the lower parts of their host plants; larvae feed on various grasses, especially on Agrostis and Alopecurus species. In March, the caterpillars begin to pupate on plant parts that are close to the ground. The pupa is initially greenish, changing to greenish yellow and, ultimately, to dark brown, before the adults emerge. The pupal stage takes 21 days.

== Description in Seitz ==
Z. telmessia (47 b, 48 a) finally is a form from Cyprus and the district of Asia Minor lying opposite and is distinguished by a differently shaped scent-patch in the male. Around the tip of this patch the ground-colour is of a lighter brown, so that the patch appears much brighter, more velvety, and more prominent. In the female the disc is not ochre-yellow, but bright foxy brown; in both sexes the underside is also a little different from the nymotypical jurtina. Specimens from Cyprus are said to have a much more rounded forewing, but such variations in shape occur also elsewhere in Europe, tough as rather rare exceptions. The specimens usually sold as telmessia belong doubtless generally to the south-eastern local forms of hispulla, the direction of variation of which has still to be more accurately ascertained. We figure 47 b true Cyprian specimens, 48 a, a specimen from the Danube in which specimen the characteristics of telmessia are much more strongly expressed.
