= Cercoptera banonii =

Scientific classification
- Domain: Eukaryota
- Kingdom: Animalia
- Phylum: Arthropoda
- Class: Insecta
- Order: Coleoptera
- Suborder: Polyphaga
- Infraorder: Cucujiformia
- Family: Cerambycidae
- Genus: Cercoptera
- Species: C. banonii

Binomial name
- Cercoptera banonii Spinola, 1839

Species of beetle

Cercoptera banonii is a species of beetle in the family Cerambycidae. It was described by Spinola in 1839.
