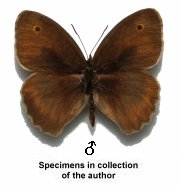

Conservation status
- Near Threatened (IUCN 3.1)

Scientific classification
- Kingdom: Animalia
- Phylum: Arthropoda
- Class: Insecta
- Order: Lepidoptera
- Family: Nymphalidae
- Genus: Maniola
- Species: M. chia

Binomial name
- Maniola chia Thomson, 1987

= Maniola chia =

Species of butterfly

Maniola chia is a species of butterfly in the family Nymphalidae. It is endemic to Chios and Oinousses in the Aegean Islands. It is a very common butterfly found amongst grassy flowery places but it is almost impossible to distinguish the specimens from Maniola jurtina.

== Flight period ==
The species has one brood per year (univoltine) and is on wing from late May to early August.

== Food plants ==
Larvae feed on grasses.
