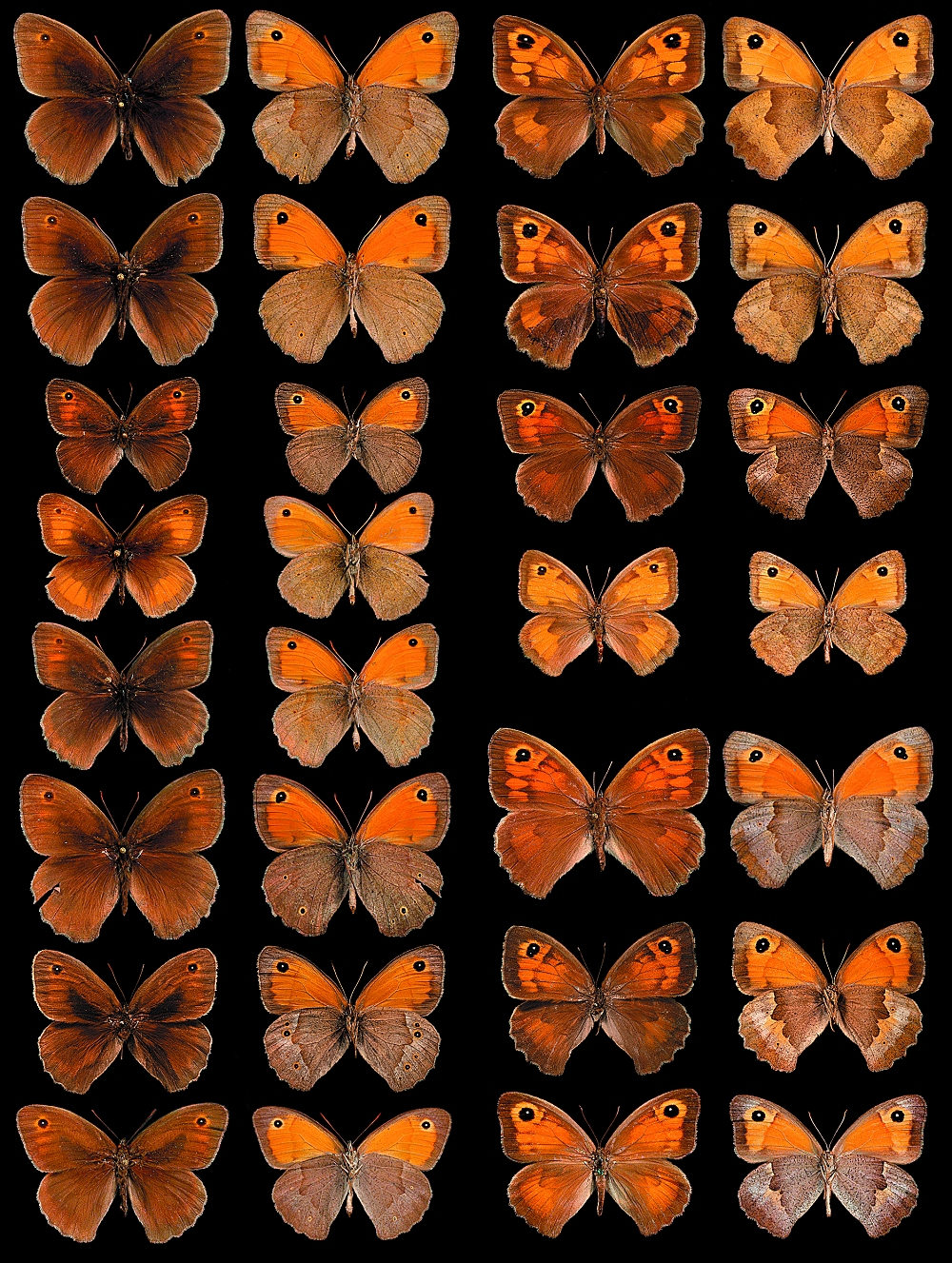

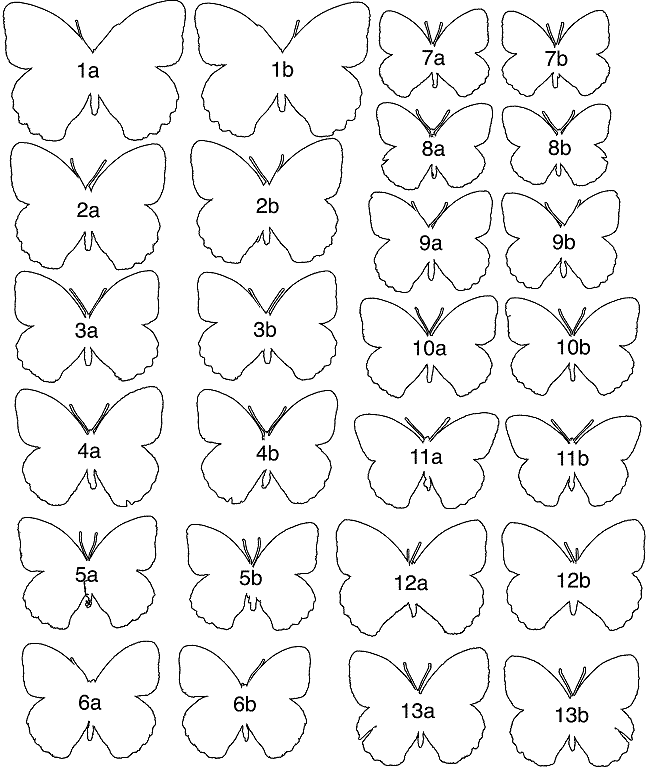
- Maniola species. 1. M. jurtina France (male), 2. M. jurtina France (female), 3. M. jurtina Sardinia (male), 4. M. jurtina Sardinia (female), 5. M. telmessia (male), 6. M. telmessia (female), 7. M. nurag (male), 8. M. nurag intermediate form (male), 9. M. nurag (female), 10. M. chia (male), 11. M. chia (female), 12. M. halicarnassus (male), 13. M. halicarnassus (female), 14. M. cypricola (male), and 15. M. cypricola (female)

Scientific classification
- Domain: Eukaryota
- Kingdom: Animalia
- Phylum: Arthropoda
- Class: Insecta
- Order: Lepidoptera
- Family: Nymphalidae
- Subtribe: Maniolina
- Genus: Maniola; Schrank, 1801

Synonyms
- Epinephele

= Maniola =

Genus of butterflies

Maniola is a genus of butterflies within the family Nymphalidae.

== List of species ==
- Maniola telmessia (Zeller, 1847) – Turkish meadow brown
- Maniola halicarnassus Thomson, 1990
- Maniola nurag Ghiliani, 1852 – Sardinian meadow brown
- Maniola cypricola (Graves, 1928)
- Maniola chia Thomson, 1987
- Maniola jurtina (Linnaeus, 1758) – meadow brown
- Maniola megala (Oberthür, 1909)
