= Antonio Garbiglietti =

Italian entomologist

Antonio Garbiglietti (30 November 1807, Biella – 24 January 1887, Turin) was an Italian entomologist who specialised in Heteroptera. He wrote (1869). Catalogus methodicus et synonymicus et hemipterorum eteropterorum (Rhyngotha Fabr.) Italiae indigenarum. Accedit descriptio aliquot specierum vel minus vel nondum cognitarum. Bull. Soc. Entomol. Ital. 1: 41-52, 105-124, 181-198, 271-281.

Garbiglietti was a physician. His collection is held by the Dipartimento Biologia Animale, Università di Torino-Turin Museum of Natural History.
