= Turin Museum of Natural History =

Coordinates: 45°3′53″N 7°41′19″E

- Museo regionale di scienze naturali

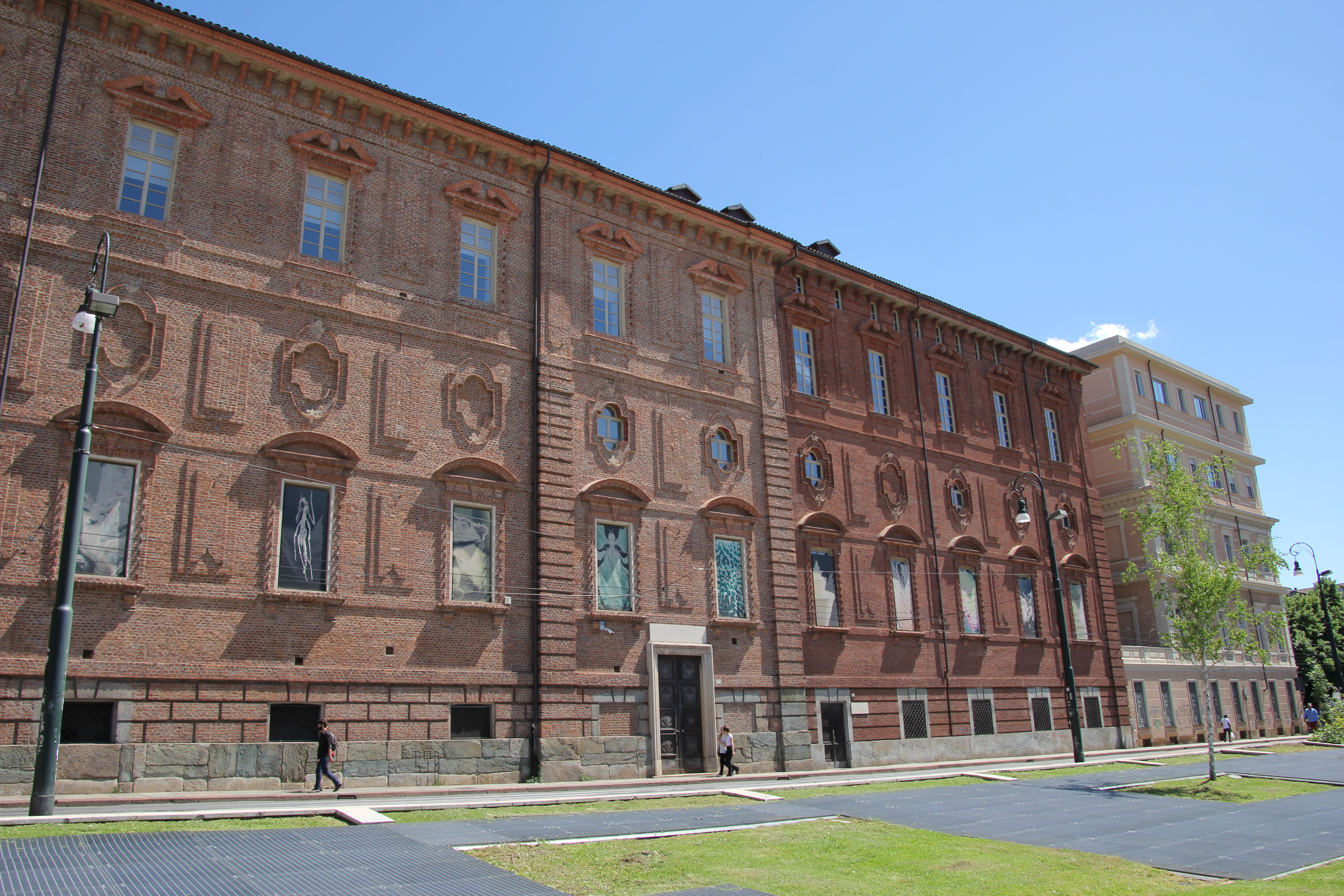
- Established: 1978
- Location: Via Giovanni Giolitti 36, Turin, Italy
- Type: Natural history museum
- Director: Marco Chiriotti
- Website: www.mrsntorino.it/cms/

The Turin Museum of Natural History (Italian: Museo Regionale di Scienze Naturali di Torino or MRSN) was established in 1978 to house the natural history collections of the University of Turin and other collections of natural history, originated from specific research campaigns and donations. It is located at 36 Via Giolitti, Turin, in a 17th-century building which used to be the hospital of San Giovanni Battista, build by Amedeo di Castellamonte.

The museum has departments (sezioni) of zoology, entomology, botany, minerals, geology and paleontology. It also has a specialist library and an exhibition centre.

== People ==
Naturalists associated with the collections include:

- Franco Andrea Bonelli
- Maximilian Spinola
- Luigi Bellardi
- Antonio Garbiglietti
- Franco Andreone
- Carlo Pollonera
