= Vittore Ghiliani =

Italian entomologist

Vittore Ghiliani (14 May 1812 – 17 May 1878), was an Italian entomologist.

From 1832 until his death he worked as an assistant (curator) in the Zoological Museum of Turin where he was responsible for the Hymenoptera and Coleoptera collections of Maximilian Spinola and the Ferdinando Breme collection of Coleoptera and Diptera. Vittore Ghiliani was an "adviser" of the Italian Entomological Society from 1869 to 1871 and Vice-President from 1871 until 1878. He published a series of scientific papers on the Coleoptera of Sardinia, Sicily, Spain and Brazil and edited by Lorenzo Camerano an important list of species of Coleoptera from Piedmont. In Compte rendu des hyménoptères inédits provenants du voyage entokologique de M. Ghiliani dans le Para en 1846. Memoire della Reale Accademia della Scienze di Torino (2)13: 19–94 Spinola comments that M. Ghiliani in 1846 embarked to Brazil where he remained for three years, having disembarked in Belém, collecting insects of all the orders.

== Works ==
Partial list

- Insetti di Sicilia determinati dal Sig. F. Ghiliani nel suo viaggio in questa isola. Anno 1839. Atti Acc. Gioenia, Catania, 19: 19–48 (1842)
- Materiali per servire alla compilazione della Fauna entomologica Italiana, ossia elenco delle specie di Lepidotteri riconosciuti esistenti negli Stati Sardi Memorie delta R. Acc. delle Sc. di Torino, xiv (1854)
- Elenco delle specie di Coleotteri trovate in Piemonte. Annali della Accademia d'Agricoltura di Torino 29:195–381 (1886)
