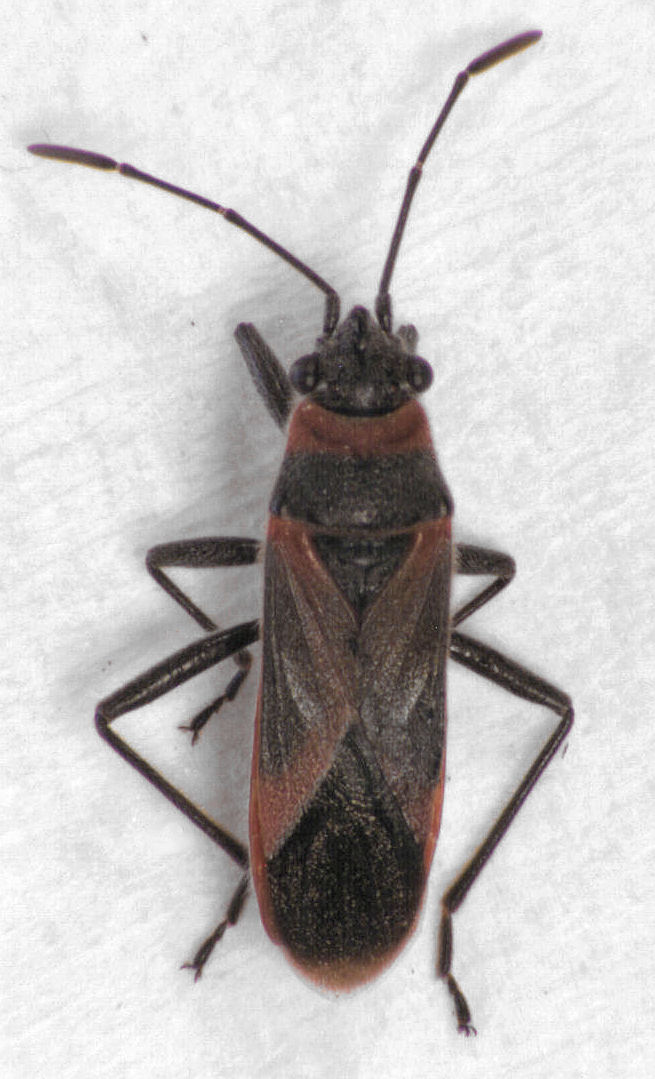

Scientific classification
- Domain: Eukaryota
- Kingdom: Animalia
- Phylum: Arthropoda
- Class: Insecta
- Order: Hemiptera
- Suborder: Heteroptera
- Family: Lygaeidae
- Genus: Arocatus
- Species: A. rusticus

Binomial name
- Arocatus rusticus (Stal, 1867)

= Arocatus rusticus =

Species of seed bug

Arocatus rusticus, the swan plant seed bug, is a species of seed bug in the family Lygaeidae. It is found in Australia and New Zealand.
