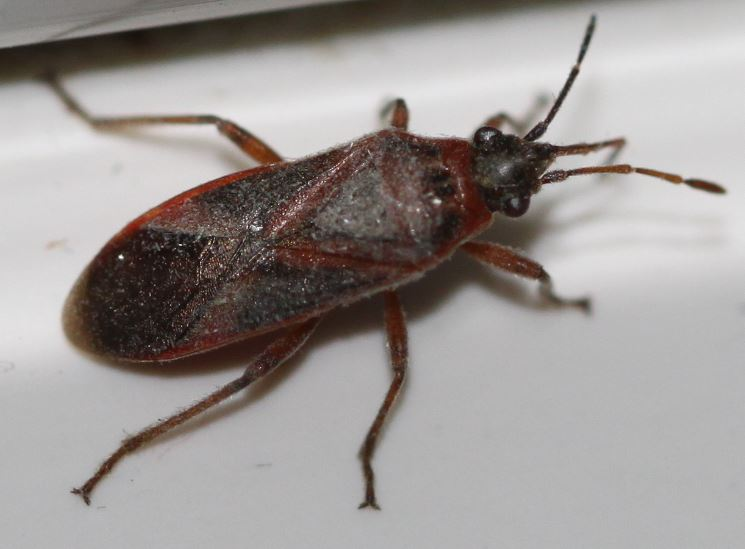
- Arocatus longiceps, plane tree bug, Germany

Scientific classification
- Domain: Eukaryota
- Kingdom: Animalia
- Phylum: Arthropoda
- Class: Insecta
- Order: Hemiptera
- Suborder: Heteroptera
- Family: Lygaeidae
- Genus: Arocatus
- Species: A. longiceps

Binomial name
- Arocatus longiceps Stal, 1872

= Arocatus longiceps =

Species of seed bug

Arocatus longiceps, the plane tree bug, is a species of seed bug in the family Lygaeidae, found mainly in Europe.

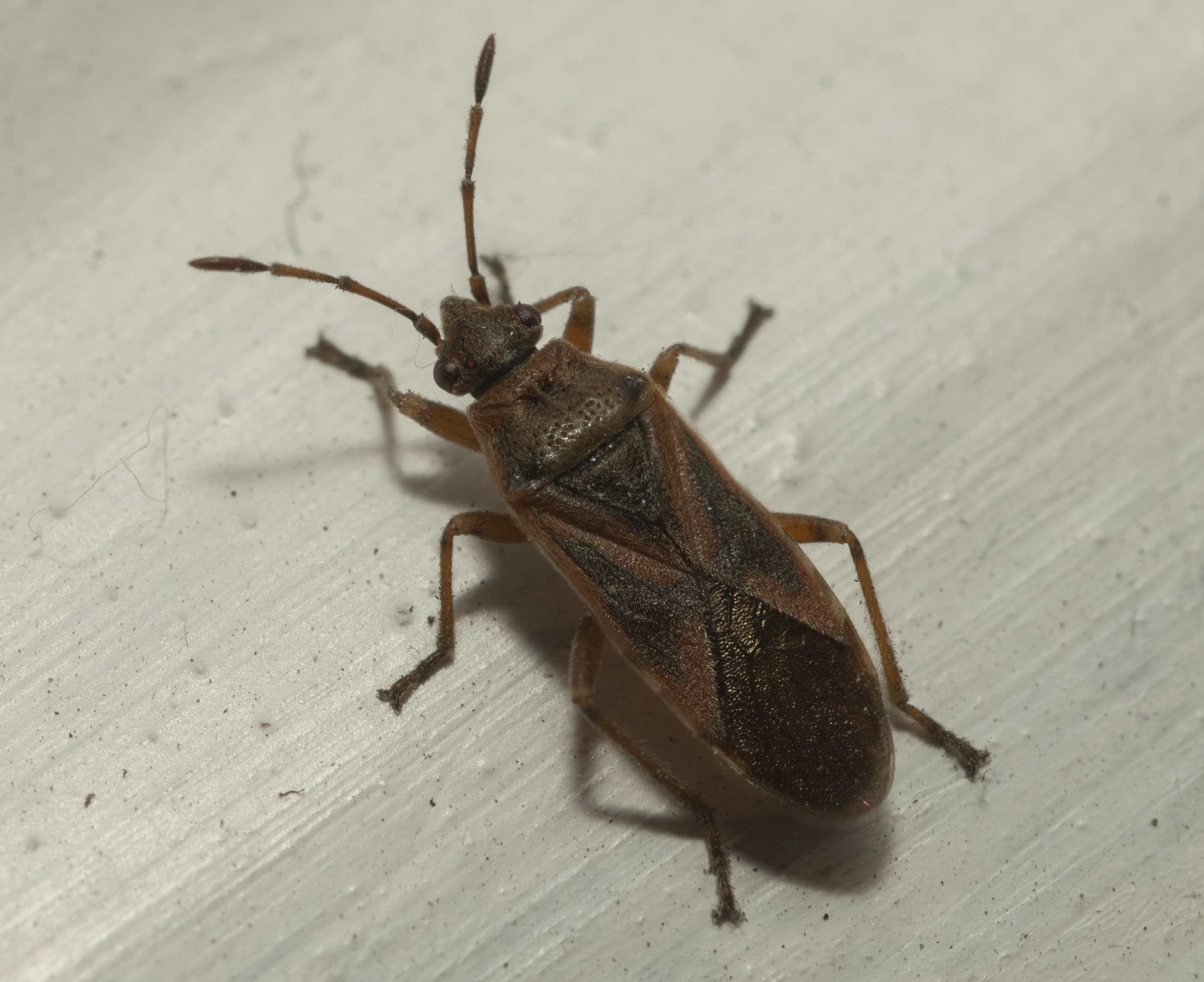
Arocatus longiceps, plane tree bug

== Subspecies ==
These five subspecies belong to the species Arocatus longiceps:

- Arocatus longiceps fuscipes Picco, 1920
- Arocatus longiceps longiceps Stal, 1872
- Arocatus longiceps nigrirostris Picco, 1920
- Arocatus longiceps sanguineus Picco, 1920
- Arocatus longiceps thoracicus Picco, 1920
