= Maximilian Spinola =

Italian entomologist

Count Maximilian Spinola
- Born: 10 July 1780; Pézenas, Hérault, France
- Died: 12 November 1857 (aged 77); Tassarolo, Alessandria, Italy
- Known for: Describing many taxa
- Scientific career
- Fields: Entomology
- Author abbrev. (zoology): Spinola

Maximilian Spinola (Italian: Massimiliano Spinola; July 10, 1780 – November 12, 1857) was an Italian entomologist.

== Background ==
Spinola was born in Pézenas, Hérault, France. The family of Spinola was of very long standing and had great wealth and power in Genoa. Maximilian Spinola was a descendant of the famous Spanish General Ambrogio Spinola, marqués de los Balbases (1569–1630) and much of his wealth derived from land held in Spain and South America. He was linked to Camillo Pallavicini.

== Research ==
He received many insects from his properties in Spain and South America. He also made extensive, and expensive purchases especially of large showy tropical beetles and wasps. His entomological contributions were mainly in the orders Coleoptera, Hymenoptera and Hemiptera.

Spinola made very important contributions to entomology, describing many taxa, especially in Spinola M. M., 1850.Tavola sinottica dei generi spettanti alla classe degli insetti Arthroidignati, Hemiptera Linn., Latr. - Rhyngota Fab. - Rhynchota Burm. Memoria del Socio Attuale signor Marchese Massimiliano Spinola Modena, Dal tipi delle R.D. Camera. Soc. Ital. Sci., T.25, pt.1: 138 pp.

He is listed, as Count Maximilian Spinola, as an ordinary member of the Entomological Society of London in the Society's first volume of transactions published in 1836. At that time he lived in Genoa.

Spinola's Coleoptera (with types purchased from Dejean), Hymenoptera (with types purchased from Audinet-Serville and Amédée Louis Michel le Peletier, comte de Saint-FargeauLepeletier and specimens from the Pierre André Latreille Collection), Hemiptera collection is in Museo Regionale di Scienze Naturali in Turin, Italy. Other specimens are in Museo di storia naturale dell'Università di Pisa. Most of his type specimens are extant and in good condition.

He died in Tassarolo, Alessandria, Italy.

== Works ==
partial list

- 1806. Insectorum Liguriæ Species Novæ aut Rariores, quas in agro Ligustico nuper detexit, descripsit, et iconibus illustravit. Tom. 1. xvii+159 pp. Genuæ.
- 1808. Insectorum Liguriae species novae aut rariores, quae in agro Ligustico nuper detexit, descripsit et iconibus illustravit Maximilianus Spinola, adjecto Catalogo spiecierum auctoribus jam enumeratarum, quae in eadam regione occurrunt, Vol. 2. Gravier, Genuae.
- 1839. Compte rendu des hyménoptères recueillis par M. Fischer pendant son voyage en Égypte, et communiqués par M. le Docteur Waltl a Maximilien. Annales de la Société Entomologique de France 7: 437-546.
- 1839 Essai sur les Fulgorelles, sous-tribu de la tribu des Cicadaires, ordre des Rhynchotes Ann. Soc. ent. France 8, 133-137, 339-454
- 1843. Sur quelques Hyménoptères peu connus, recueillis en Espagne, pendant l’année 1842, par M. Victor Ghiliani, voyageur-naturaliste. Annales de la Société Entomologique de France (2)1: 111-144.
- 1851. Hyménopteros. in Gay, C., Historia Fisica y Politica de Chile. Zoologia. Vol. 6. Casa del author, Paris. pp. 153–569.
- 1853. Compte rendu des hyménoptères inédits provenants du voyage entomologique de M. Ghiliani dans le Para en 1846. Memoire della Reale Accademia della Scienze di Torino (2)13: 19-94.
