= List of birds of Costa Rica =

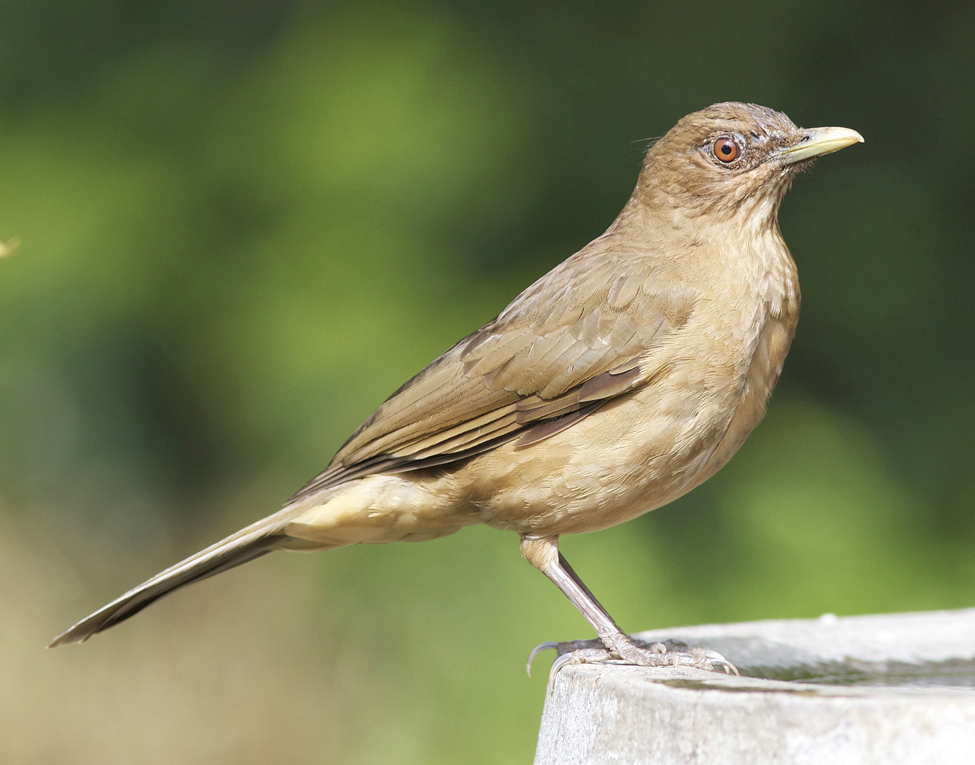
The clay-colored thrush is the national bird of Costa Rica

Although Costa Rica is a small country, it is in the bird-rich neotropical region and has a huge number of species for its area. The official bird list published by the Costa Rican Rare Birds and Records Committee of the Asociación Ornitológica de Costa Rica (AOCR) contained 948 species as of July 2023.

Of those species, seven are endemic (three of which are found only on Cocos Island), 90 are rare or accidental, and four have been introduced by humans. Another 73 are near-endemic with ranges that include only Costa Rica and Panama. Twenty-seven species, including five of the seven endemics, are globally vulnerable or endangered. Over an area of 51,180 km^{2} (19,760 sq mi), this is the greatest density of bird species of any continental American country. About 600 species are resident, with most of the other regular visitors being winter migrants from North America.

Costa Rica's geological formation played a large role in the diversification of avian species. North America and South America were isolated continents, but approximately 70 million years of volcanic and seismic activity have eventually fused the two continents together through repeated advancement and reversal associated with sediment accumulation and sea level changes. When the remaining island arc filled in 4 to 2.5 million years ago, species from the north and south poured into the land bridge that became Central America during a climactic period of the Great American Interchange. Molecular phylogeny suggests that hummingbirds had been crossing to North America even in the Oligocene, while other species like the jays of genus Cyanolyca came from the north in the late Miocene, with C. cucullata later pioneering northward in reverse at time of the land bridge completion.

Part of the diversity stems from the wide array of habitats, which include mangrove swamps along the Pacific coast, the wet Caribbean coastal plain in the northeast, dry northern Pacific lowlands, and multiple mountain chains that form the spine of the country and rise as high as 3,500 m. These mountain chains, the largest of which is the Cordillera de Talamanca, form a geographical barrier that has enabled closely related but different species to develop on either side of the chain. A good example of this speciation is the white-collared manakin of the Caribbean side, which is now distinct from the orange-collared manakin of the Pacific slope.

In the past, higher sea levels left the mountains as highlands, and isolation again led to distinct species developing, with over thirty now endemic to the mountains, especially the Talamanca range which extends from southern Costa Rica into Panama.

This list is presented in the taxonomic sequence of the Check-list of North and Middle American Birds, 7th edition through the 63rd Supplement, published by the American Ornithological Society (AOS). Common and scientific names are also those of the Check-list, except that the common names of families are from the Clements taxonomy because the AOS list does not include them.

Unless otherwise noted, all species on the list are considered to occur regularly in Costa Rica as permanent residents, summer or winter visitors, or migrants. The following tags have been used to highlight certain categories of occurrence:

- (A) Accidental - a species that rarely or accidentally occurs in Costa Rica
- (R?) Residence uncertain - a species which might be resident
- (E) Endemic - a species endemic to Costa Rica
- (E-R) Regional endemic - a species found only in Costa Rica and Panama
- (I) Introduced - a species introduced to Costa Rica as a consequence, direct or indirect, of human actions

== Tinamous ==
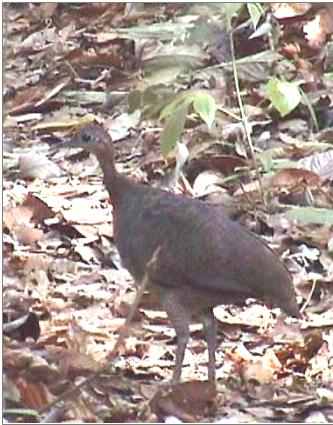
Great tinamou

Order: Tinamiformes Family: Tinamidae

The tinamous are one of the most ancient groups of birds. Although they look similar to other ground-dwelling birds like quail and grouse, they have no close relatives and are classified as a single family, Tinamidae, within their own order, the Tinamiformes. They are distantly related to the ratites (order Struthioniformes) which includes the rheas, emu, and kiwis.

- Highland tinamou, Nothocercus bonapartei
- Great tinamou, Tinamus major
- Little tinamou, Crypturellus soui
- Thicket tinamou, Crypturellus cinnamomeus
- Slaty-breasted tinamou, Crypturellus boucardi

== Ducks, geese, and waterfowl ==
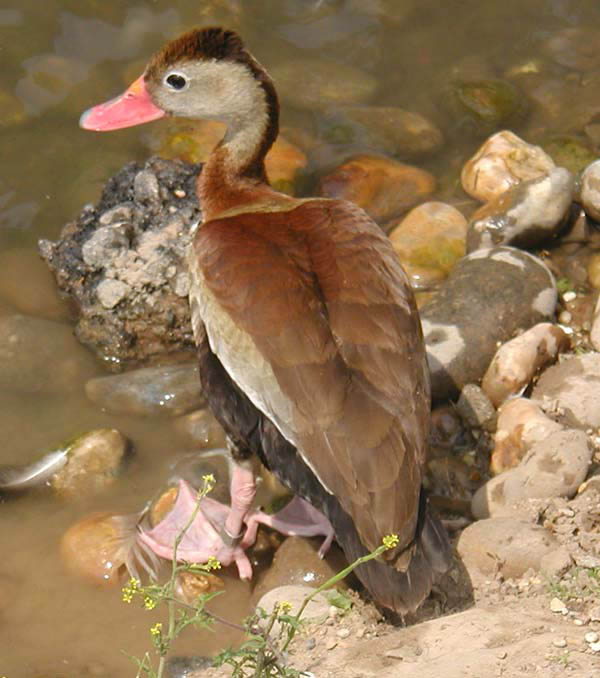
Black-bellied whistling-duck

Order: Anseriformes Family: Anatidae

Anatidae includes the ducks and most duck-like waterfowl, such as geese and swans. These birds are adapted to an aquatic existence with webbed feet, flattened bills, and feathers that are excellent at shedding water due to an oily coating.

- White-faced whistling-duck, Dendrocygna viduata
- Black-bellied whistling-duck, Dendrocygna autumnalis
- Fulvous whistling-duck, Dendrocygna bicolor
- Greater white-fronted goose, Anser albifrons (A)
- Comb duck, Sarkidiornis silvicola (R?)
- Orinoco goose, Oressochen jubatus (A)
- Muscovy duck, Cairina moschata
- Blue-winged teal, Spatula discors
- Cinnamon teal, Spatula cyanoptera
- Northern shoveler, Spatula clypeata
- American wigeon, Mareca americana
- Mallard, Anas platyrhynchos
- White-cheeked pintail, Anas bahamensis (A)
- Northern pintail, Anas acuta
- Green-winged teal, Anas crecca
- Canvasback, Aythya valisineria (A)
- Redhead, Aythya americana (A)
- Common pochard, Aythya ferina (A)
- Ring-necked duck, Aythya collaris
- Greater scaup, Aythya marila (A)
- Lesser scaup, Aythya affinis
- Hooded merganser, Lophodytes cucullatus (A)
- Red-breasted Merganser, Mergus serrator (A)
- Masked duck, Nomonyx dominicus
- Ruddy duck, Oxyura jamaicensis (A)

== Guans, chachalacas, and curassows ==
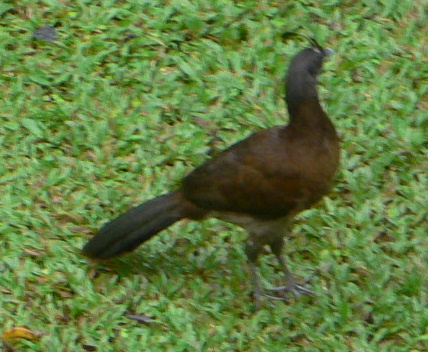
Gray-headed chachalaca

Order: Galliformes Family: Cracidae

The Cracidae are large birds, similar in general appearance to turkeys. The guans and curassows live in trees, but the smaller chachalacas are found in more open scrubby habitats. They are generally dull-plumaged, but the curassows and some guans have colorful facial ornaments.

- Plain chachalaca, Ortalis vetula
- Gray-headed chachalaca, Ortalis cinereiceps
- Crested guan, Penelope purpurascens
- Black guan, Chamaepetes unicolor (E-R)
- Great curassow, Crax rubra (vulnerable)

== New World quail ==
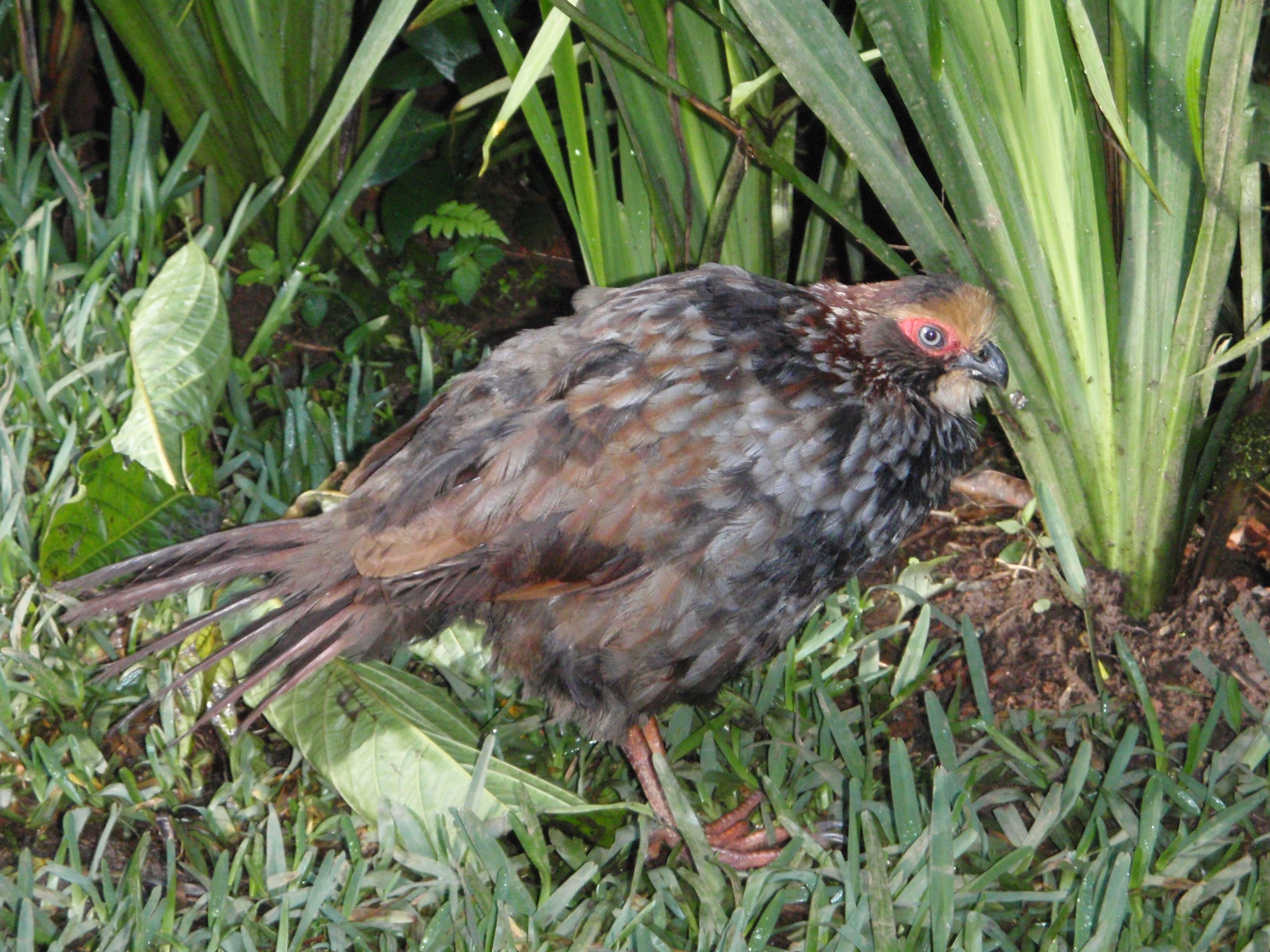
Buffy-crowned wood-partridge

Order: Galliformes Family: Odontophoridae

The New World quail are small, plump terrestrial birds only distantly related to the quails of the Old World, but named for their similar appearance and habits.

- Tawny-faced quail, Rhynchortyx cinctus
- Buffy-crowned wood-partridge, Dendrortyx leucophrys
- Crested bobwhite, Colinus cristatus
- Marbled wood-quail, Odontophorus gujanensis
- Black-eared wood-quail, Odontophorus melanotis
- Black-breasted wood-quail, Odontophorus leucolaemus (E-R)
- Spotted wood-quail, Odontophorus guttatus

== Grebes ==
Order: Podicipediformes Family: Podicipedidae

Grebes are small to medium-large freshwater diving birds. They have lobed toes and are excellent swimmers and divers. However, they have their feet placed far back on the body, making them quite ungainly on land.

- Least grebe, Tachybaptus dominicus
- Pied-billed grebe, Podilymbus podiceps
- Eared grebe, Podiceps nigricollis (A)

== Pigeons and doves ==
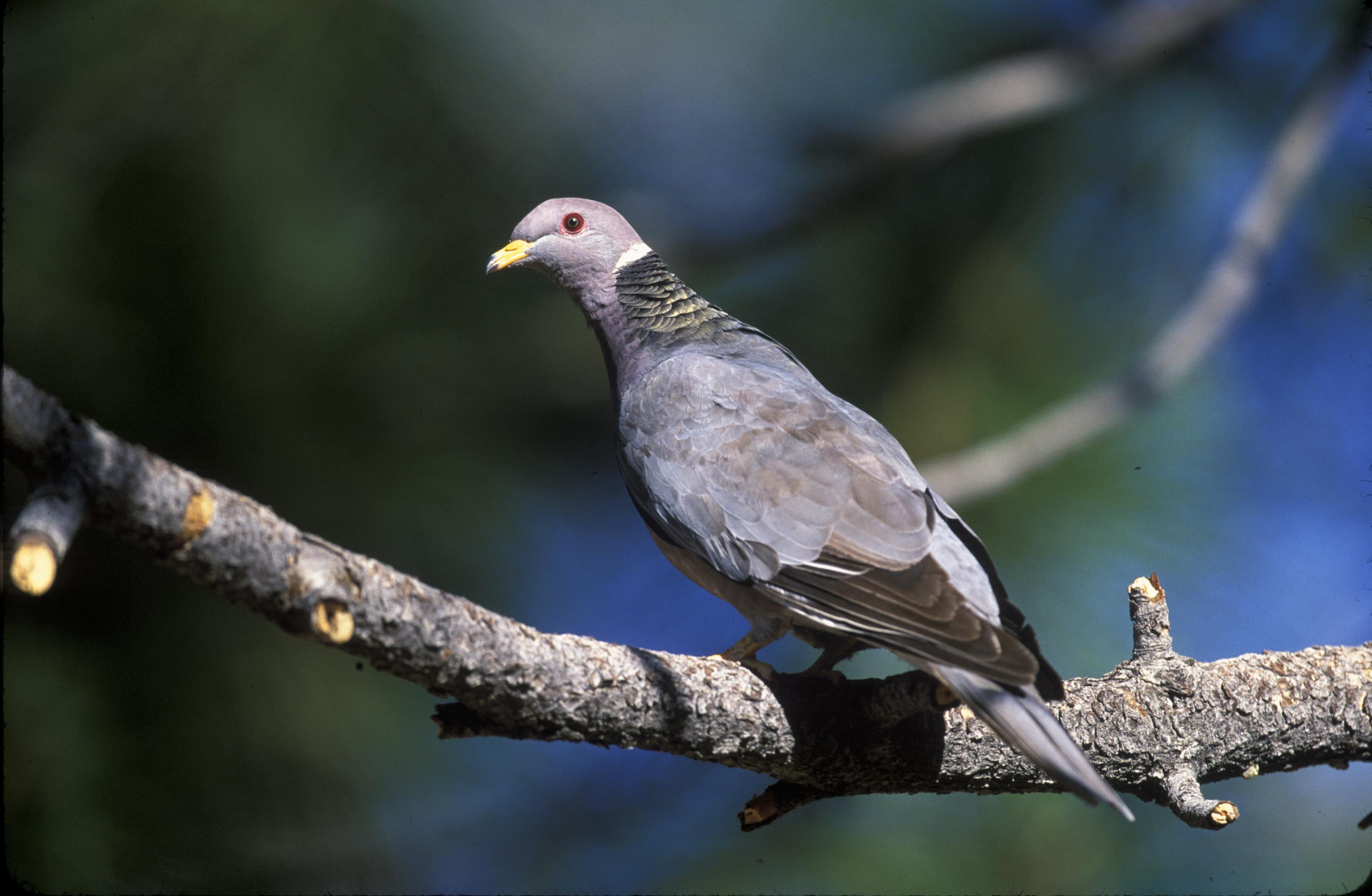
Band-tailed pigeon

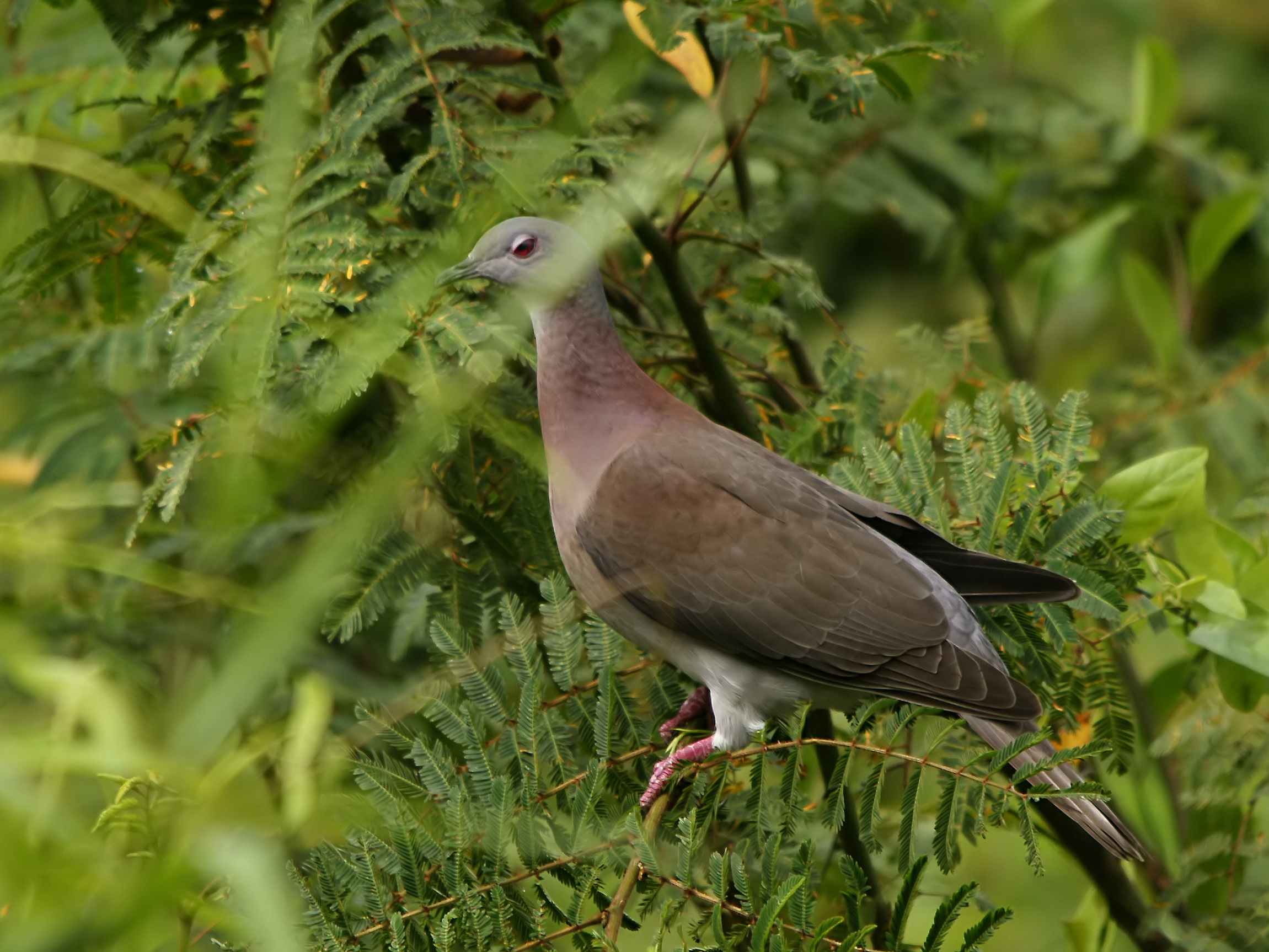
Pale-vented pigeon

Order: Columbiformes Family: Columbidae

Pigeons and doves are stout-bodied birds with short necks and short slender bills with a fleshy cere.

- Rock pigeon, Columba livia (I)
- Pale-vented pigeon, Patagioenas cayennensis
- Scaled pigeon, Patagioenas speciosa
- White-crowned pigeon, Patagioenas leucocephala
- Red-billed pigeon, Patagioenas flavirostris
- Band-tailed pigeon, Patagioenas fasciata
- Ruddy pigeon, Patagioenas subvinacea
- Short-billed pigeon, Patagioenas nigrirostris
- Eurasian collared-dove, Streptopelia decaocto (I) (A) (R?)
- Inca dove, Columbina inca
- Common ground dove, Columbina passerina
- Plain-breasted ground dove, Columbina minuta
- Ruddy ground dove, Columbina talpacoti
- Blue ground dove, Claravis pretiosa
- Maroon-chested ground dove, Paraclaravis mondetoura
- Ruddy quail-dove, Geotrygon montana
- Violaceous quail-dove, Geotrygon violacea
- Olive-backed quail-dove, Leptotrygon veraguensis
- White-tipped dove, Leptotila verreauxi
- Gray-chested dove, Leptotila cassinii
- Gray-headed dove, Leptotila plumbeiceps
- Buff-fronted quail-dove, Zentrygon costaricensis (E-R)
- Purplish-backed quail-dove, Zentrygon lawrencii (E-R)
- Chiriqui quail-dove, Zentrygon chiriquensis (E-R)
- White-winged dove, Zenaida asiatica
- Eared dove, Zenaida auriculata (A)
- Mourning dove, Zenaida macroura

== Cuckoos ==
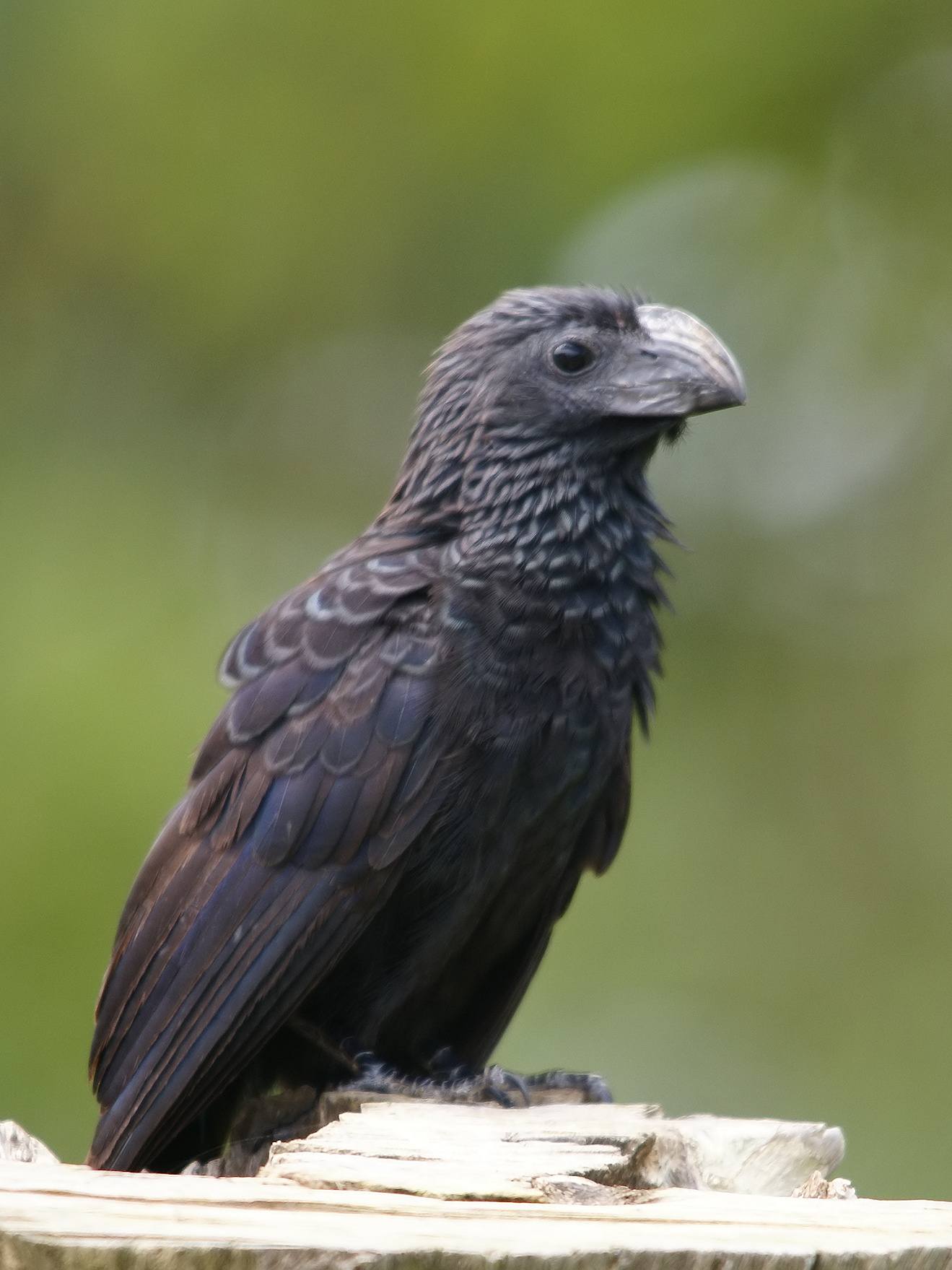
Groove-billed ani

Order: Cuculiformes Family: Cuculidae

The family Cuculidae includes cuckoos, roadrunners, and anis. These birds are of variable size with slender bodies, long tails, and strong legs. The Old World cuckoos are brood parasites.

- Greater ani, Crotophaga major
- Smooth-billed ani, Crotophaga ani
- Groove-billed ani, Crotophaga sulcirostris
- Striped cuckoo, Tapera naevia
- Pheasant cuckoo, Dromococcyx phasianellus
- Lesser ground-cuckoo, Morococcyx erythropygus
- Rufous-vented ground-cuckoo, Neomorphus geoffroyi
- Squirrel cuckoo, Piaya cayana
- Dark-billed cuckoo, Coccyzus melacoryphus
- Yellow-billed cuckoo, Coccyzus americanus
- Mangrove cuckoo, Coccyzus minor (R?)
- Cocos cuckoo, Coccyzus ferrugineus (E) (vulnerable)
- Black-billed cuckoo, Coccyzus erythropthalmus

== Nightjars and allies ==
Order: Caprimulgiformes Family: Caprimulgidae

Nightjars are medium-sized nocturnal birds that usually nest on the ground. They have long wings, short legs, and very short bills. Most have small feet, of little use for walking, and long pointed wings. Their soft plumage is camouflaged to resemble bark or leaves.

- Short-tailed nighthawk, Lurocalis semitorquatus
- Lesser nighthawk, Chordeiles acutipennis
- Common nighthawk, Chordeiles minor
- Common pauraque, Nyctidromus albicollis
- Ocellated poorwill, Nyctiphrynus ocellatus
- Chuck-will's-widow, Antrostomus carolinensis
- Rufous nightjar, Antrostomus rufus
- Buff-collared nightjar, Antrostomus ridgwayi (A)
- Eastern whip-poor-will, Antrostomus vociferus
- Dusky nightjar, Antrostomus saturatus (E-R)
- White-tailed nightjar, Hydropsalis cayennensis

== Oilbird ==
Order: Steatornithiformes Family: Steatornithidae

The oilbird is a slim, long-winged bird distantly related to the nightjars. It is nocturnal and a specialist feeder on the fruit of the oil palm.

- Oilbird, Steatornis caripensis

== Potoos ==
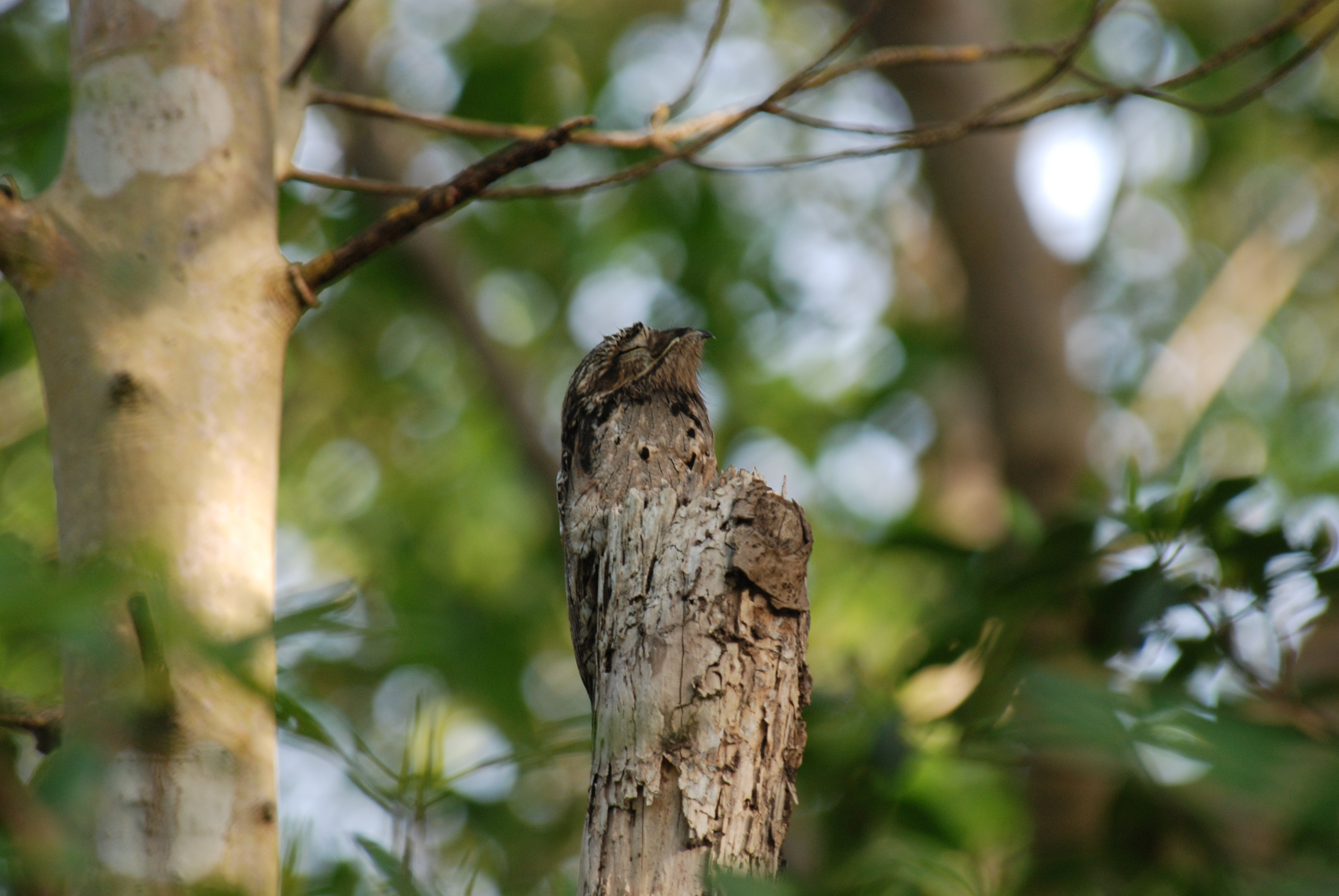
Common potoo

Order: Nyctibiiformes Family: Nyctibiidae

The potoos (sometimes called poor-me-ones) are large near passerine birds related to the nightjars and frogmouths. They are nocturnal insectivores which lack the bristles around the mouth found in the true nightjars.

- Great potoo, Nyctibius grandis
- Common potoo, Nyctibius griseus
- Northern potoo, Nyctibius jamaicensis

== Swifts ==
Order: Apodiformes Family: Apodidae

Swifts are small birds which spend the majority of their lives flying. These birds have very short legs and never settle voluntarily on the ground, perching instead only on vertical surfaces. Many swifts have long swept-back wings which resemble a crescent or boomerang.

- Black swift, Cypseloides niger (vulnerable)
- White-chinned swift, Cypseloides cryptus
- Spot-fronted swift, Cypseloides cherriei
- Chestnut-collared swift, Streptoprocne rutila
- White-collared swift, Streptoprocne zonaris
- Gray-rumped swift, Chaetura cinereiventris
- Costa Rican swift, Chaetura fumosa (E-R)
- Chimney swift, Chaetura pelagica (vulnerable)
- Vaux's swift, Chaetura vauxi
- Lesser swallow-tailed swift, Panyptila cayennensis
- Great swallow-tailed swift, Panyptila sanctihieronymi

== Hummingbirds ==
Order: Apodiformes Family: Trochilidae

Hummingbirds are small birds capable of hovering in mid-air due to the rapid flapping of their wings. They are the only birds that can fly backwards.

- White-necked jacobin, Florisuga mellivora
- White-tipped sicklebill, Eutoxeres aquila
- Bronzy hermit, Glaucis aeneus
- Band-tailed barbthroat, Threnetes ruckeri
- Green hermit, Phaethornis guy
- Long-billed hermit, Phaethornis longirostris
- Stripe-throated hermit, Phaethornis striigularis
- Green-fronted lancebill, Doryfera ludovicae
- Brown violetear, Colibri delphinae
- Mexican violetear, Colibri thalassinus (A)
- Lesser violetear, Colibri cyanotus
- Purple-crowned fairy, Heliothryx barroti
- Green-breasted mango, Anthracothorax prevostii
- Veraguan mango, Anthracothorax veraguensis (E-R)
- Green thorntail, Discosura conversii
- Rufous-crested coquette, Lophornis delattrei (A)
- Black-crested coquette, Lophornis helenae
- White-crested coquette, Lophornis adorabilis (E-R)
- Green-crowned brilliant, Heliodoxa jacula
- Rivoli's hummingbird, Eugenes fulgens (A)
- Talamanca hummingbird, Eugenes spectabilis (E-R)
- Fiery-throated hummingbird, Panterpe insignis (E-R)
- Long-billed starthroat, Heliomaster longirostris
- Plain-capped starthroat, Heliomaster constantii
- White-bellied mountain-gem, Lampornis hemileucus (E-R)
- Purple-throated mountain-gem, Lampornis calolaemus
- White-throated mountain-gem, Lampornis castaneoventris (E-R)
- Magenta-throated woodstar, Philodice bryantae (E-R)
- Ruby-throated hummingbird, Archilochus colubris
- Volcano hummingbird, Selasphorus flammula (E-R)
- Scintillant hummingbird, Selasphorus scintilla (E-R)
- Canivet's emerald, Cynanthus canivetii
- Garden emerald, Chlorostilbon assimilis (E-R)
- Violet-headed hummingbird, Klais guimeti
- Violet sabrewing, Campylopterus hemileucurus
- Bronze-tailed plumeleteer, Chalybura urochrysia
- Crowned woodnymph, Thalurania colombica
- Snowcap, Microchera albocoronata (E-R)
- Coppery-headed emerald, Microchera cupreiceps (E)
- White-tailed emerald, Microchera chionura (E-R)
- Stripe-tailed hummingbird, Eupherusa eximia
- Black-bellied hummingbird, Eupherusa nigriventris (E-R)
- Scaly-breasted hummingbird, Phaeochroa cuvierii
- Blue-vented hummingbird, Saucerottia hoffmanni
- Blue-tailed hummingbird, Saucerottia cyanura
- Snowy-bellied hummingbird, Saucerottia edward (E-R)
- Cinnamon hummingbird, Amazilia rutila
- Rufous-tailed hummingbird, Amazilia tzacatl
- Mangrove hummingbird, Amazilia boucardi (E) (endangered)
- Sapphire-throated hummingbird, Chrysuronia coeruleogularis
- Blue-chested hummingbird, Polyerata amabilis
- Charming hummingbird, Polyerata decora (E-R)
- White-bellied emerald, Chlorestes candida (R?)
- Blue-throated goldentail, Chlorestes eliciae
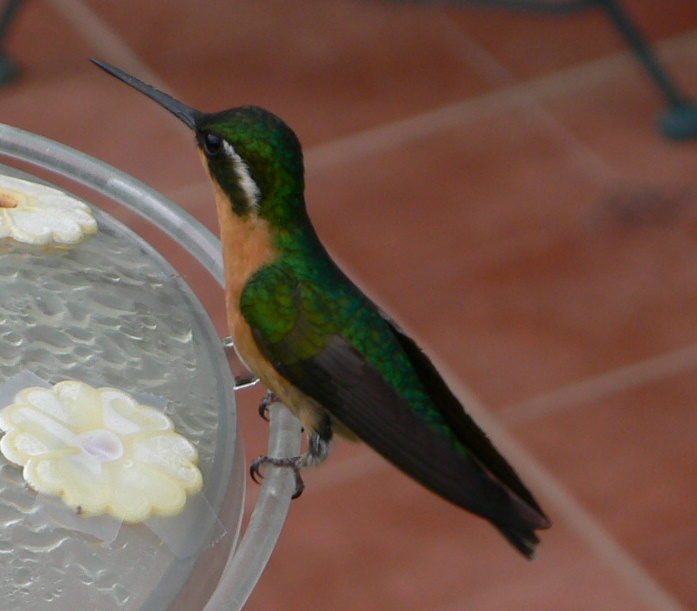
Female gray-tailed mountain-gem

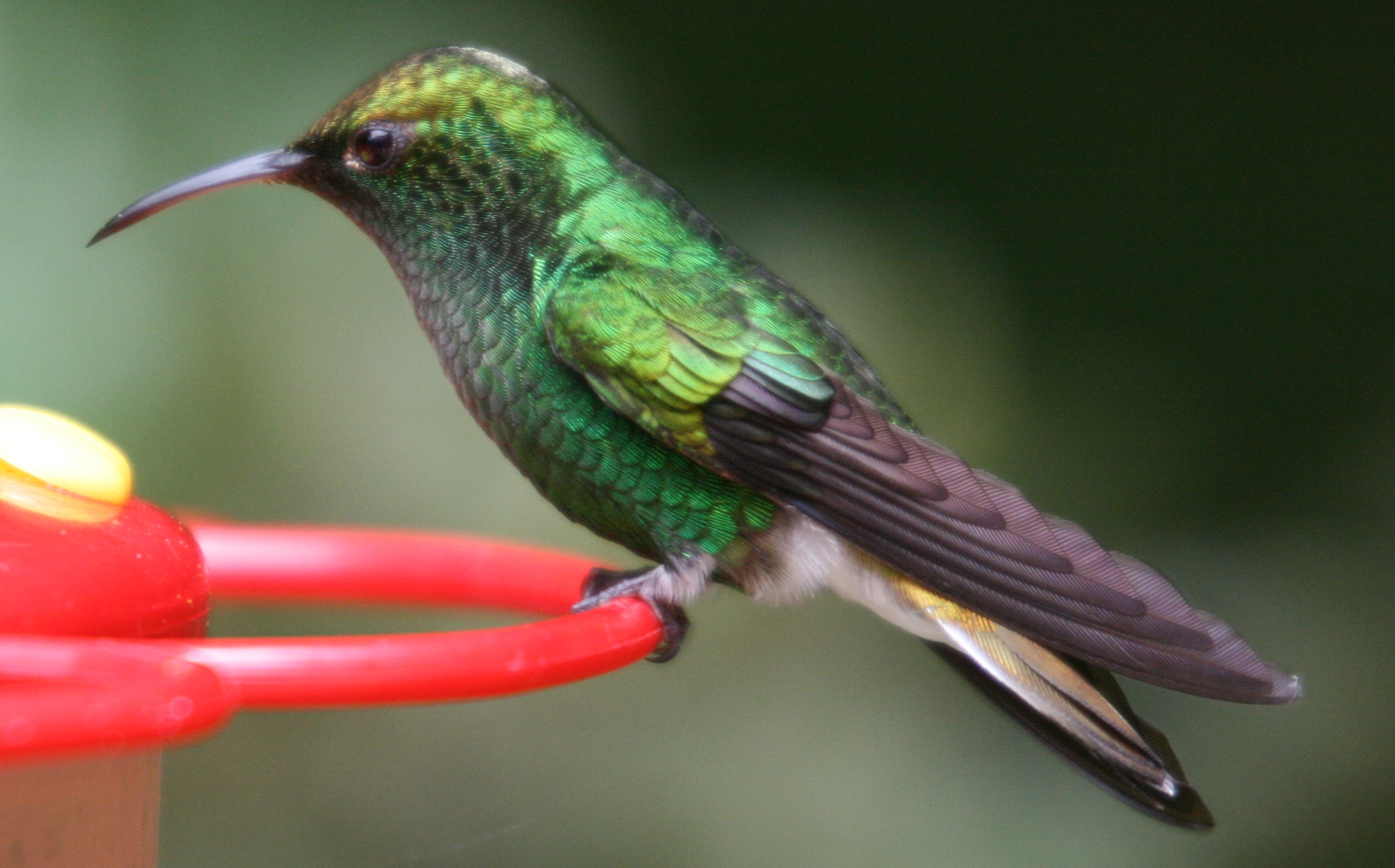
Male coppery-headed emerald, one of Costa Rica's endemics

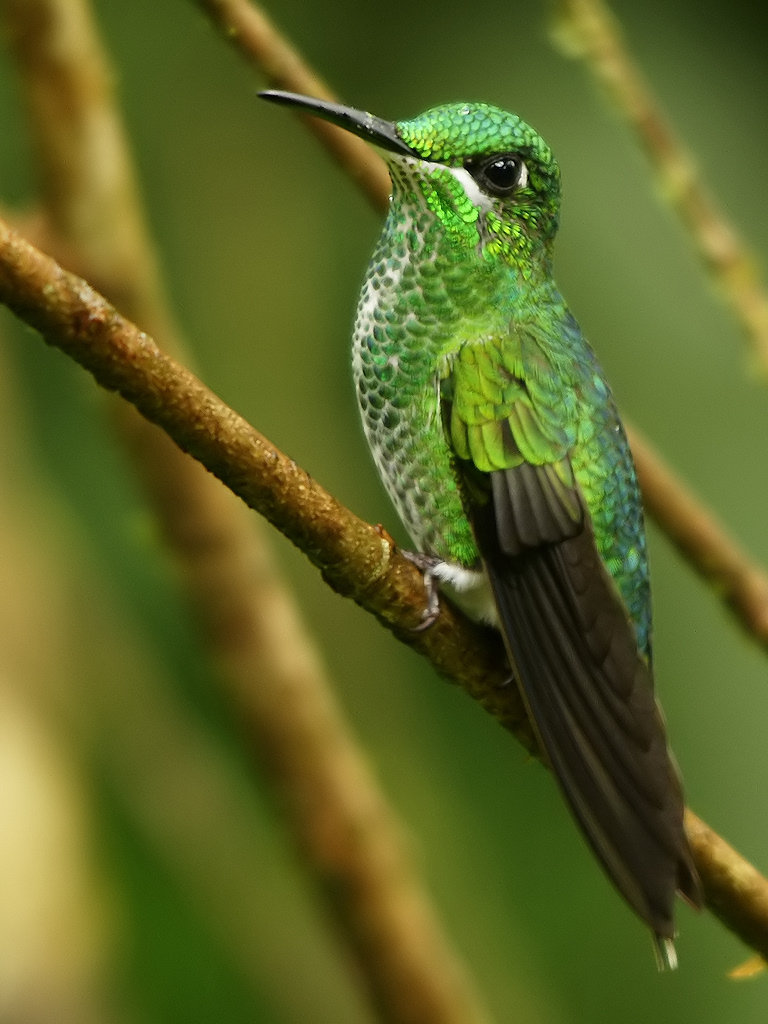
Female green-crowned brilliant

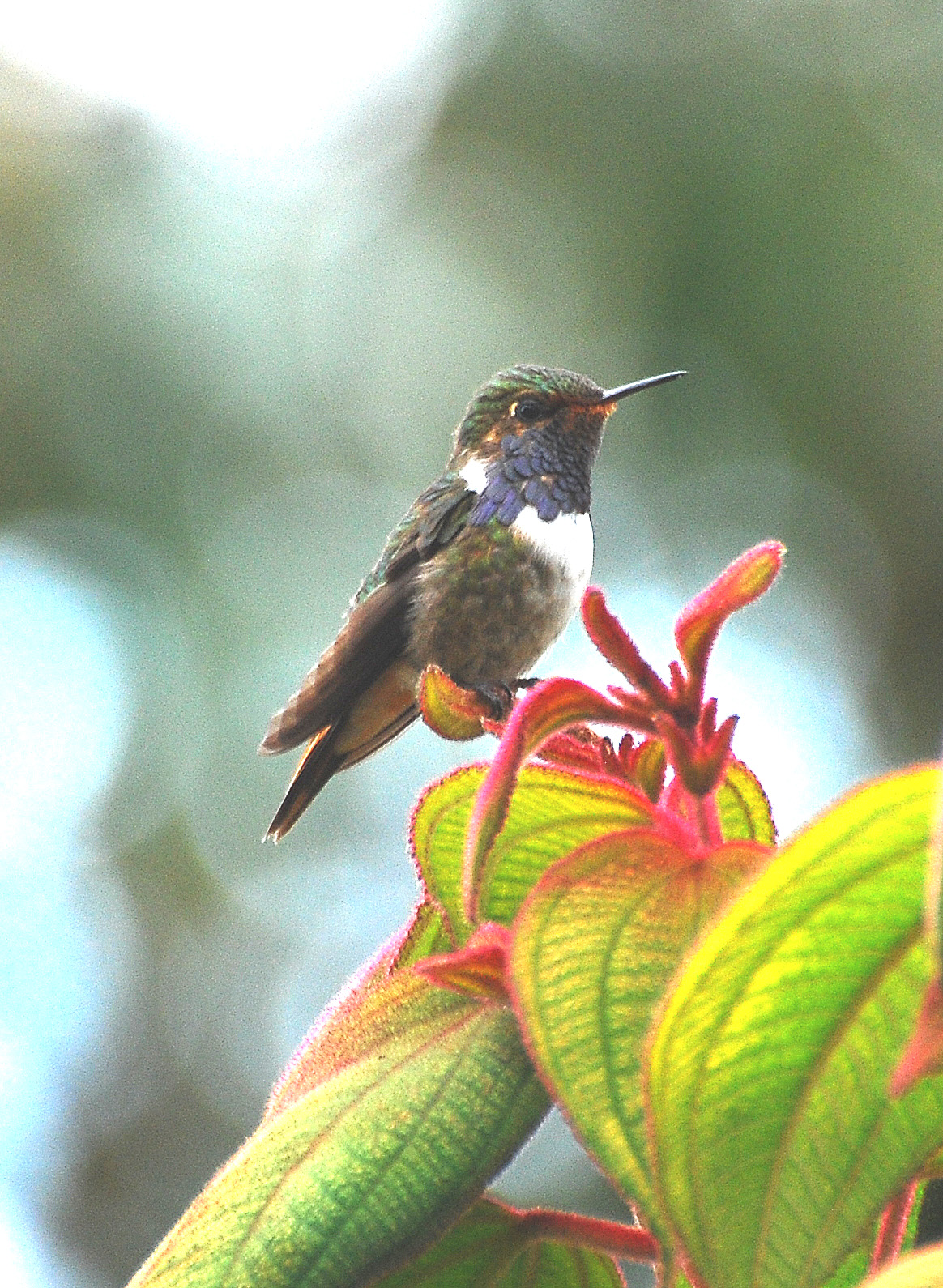
Male volcano hummingbird

== Rails, gallinules, and coots ==
Order: Gruiformes Family: Rallidae

Rallidae is a large family of small to medium-sized birds which includes the rails, crakes, coots, and gallinules. Typically they inhabit dense vegetation in damp environments near lakes, swamps, or rivers. In general they are shy and secretive birds, making them difficult to observe. Most species have strong legs and long toes which are well adapted to soft uneven surfaces. They tend to have short, rounded wings and to be weak fliers.

- Paint-billed crake, Mustelirallus erythrops
- Spotted rail, Pardirallus maculatus
- Uniform crake, Amaurolimnas concolor
- Rufous-necked wood-rail, Aramides axillaris
- Russet-naped wood-rail, Aramides albiventris
- Gray-cowled wood-rail, Aramides cajaneus
- Mangrove rail, Rallus longirostris
- Clapper rail, Rallus crepitans (A)
- Colombian crake, Mustelirallus colombianus (A)
- Sora, Porzana carolina
- Common gallinule, Gallinula galeata
- American coot, Fulica americana
- Purple gallinule, Porphyrio martinicus
- Ocellated crake, Micropygia schomburgkii
- Yellow-breasted crake, Hapalocrex flaviventer
- Ruddy crake, Laterallus ruber (R?)
- White-throated crake, Laterallus albigularis
- Gray-breasted crake, Laterallus exilis
- Black rail, Laterallus jamaicensis (A)

== Finfoots ==
Order: Gruiformes Family: Heliornithidae

Heliornithidae is a small family of tropical birds with webbed lobes on their feet similar to those of grebes and coots.

- Sungrebe, Heliornis fulica

== Limpkin ==
Order: Gruiformes Family: Aramidae

The limpkin resembles a large rail. It has drab-brown plumage and a grayer head and neck.

- Limpkin, Aramus guarauna

== Thick-knees ==
Order: Charadriiformes Family: Burhinidae

The thick-knees are a group of largely tropical waders in the family Burhinidae. They are found worldwide within the tropical zone, with some species also breeding in temperate Europe and Australia. They are medium to large waders with strong black or yellow-black bills, large yellow eyes, and cryptic plumage. Despite being classed as waders, most species have a preference for arid or semi-arid habitats.

- Double-striped thick-knee, Burhinus bistriatus

== Stilts and avocets ==
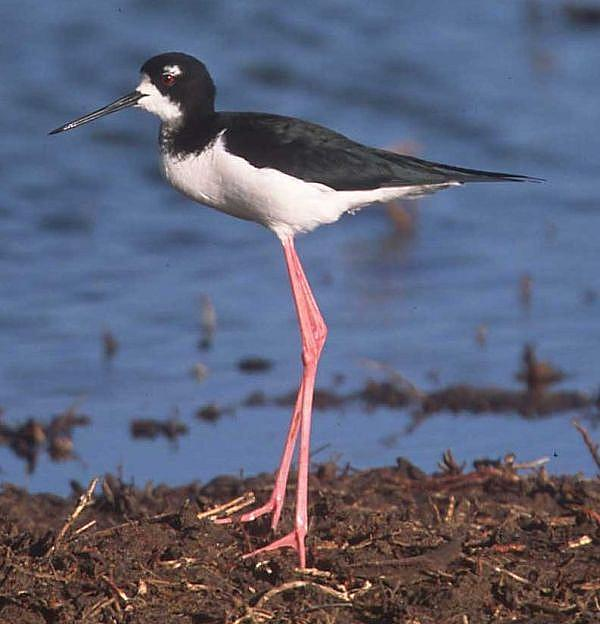
Black-necked stilt

Order: Charadriiformes Family: Recurvirostridae

Recurvirostridae is a family of large wading birds which includes the avocets and stilts. The avocets have long legs and long up-curved bills. The stilts have extremely long legs and long, thin, straight bills.

- Black-necked stilt, Himantopus mexicanus
- American avocet, Recurvirostra americana

== Oystercatchers ==
Order: Charadriiformes Family: Haematopodidae

The oystercatchers are large and noisy plover-like birds with strong bills used for smashing or prying open molluscs.

- American oystercatcher, Haematopus palliatus

== Plovers and lapwings ==
Order: Charadriiformes Family: Charadriidae

The family Charadriidae includes the plovers, dotterels, and lapwings. They are small to medium-sized birds with compact bodies, short thick necks, and long, usually pointed, wings. They are found in open country worldwide, mostly in habitats near water.

- Southern lapwing, Vanellus chilensis
- Black-bellied plover, Pluvialis squatarola
- American golden-plover, Pluvialis dominica
- Pacific golden-plover, Pluvialis fulva (A)
- Killdeer, Charadrius vociferus
- Semipalmated plover, Charadrius semipalmatus
- Piping plover, Charadrius melodus (A)
- Wilson's plover, Charadrius wilsonia
- Collared plover, Charadrius collaris
- Snowy plover, Charadrius nivosus

== Jacanas ==
Order: Charadriiformes Family: Jacanidae

The jacanas are a family of waders which are found throughout the tropics. They are identifiable by their huge feet and claws which enable them to walk on floating vegetation in the shallow lakes that are their preferred habitat.

- Northern jacana, Jacana spinosa
- Wattled jacana, Jacana jacana (A)

== Sandpipers and allies ==
Order: Charadriiformes Family: Scolopacidae

Scolopacidae is a large diverse family of small to medium-sized shorebirds including the sandpipers, curlews, godwits, shanks, tattlers, woodcocks, snipes, dowitchers, and phalaropes. The majority of these species eat small invertebrates picked out of the mud or soil. Variation in length of legs and bills enables multiple species to feed in the same habitat, particularly on the coast, without direct competition for food.

- Upland sandpiper, Bartramia longicauda
- Whimbrel, Numenius phaeopus
- Long-billed curlew, Numenius americanus
- Eskimo curlew, Numenius borealis (exterpated)
- Hudsonian godwit, Limosa haemastica
- Marbled godwit, Limosa fedoa
- Ruddy turnstone, Arenaria interpres
- Red knot, Calidris canutus
- Surfbird, Calidris virgata
- Ruff, Calidris pugnax
- Stilt sandpiper, Calidris himantopus
- Curlew sandpiper, Calidris ferruginea
- Sanderling, Calidris alba
- Dunlin, Calidris alpina
- Baird's sandpiper, Calidris bairdii
- Least sandpiper, Calidris minutilla
- White-rumped sandpiper, Calidris fuscicollis
- Buff-breasted sandpiper, Calidris subruficollis
- Pectoral sandpiper, Calidris melanotos
- Semipalmated sandpiper, Calidris pusilla
- Western sandpiper, Calidris mauri
- Short-billed dowitcher, Limnodromus griseus
- Long-billed dowitcher, Limnodromus scolopaceus
- Wilson's snipe, Gallinago delicata
- Spotted sandpiper, Actitis macularius
- Solitary sandpiper, Tringa solitaria
- Wandering tattler, Tringa incana
- Lesser yellowlegs, Tringa flavipes
- Willet, Tringa semipalmata
- Greater yellowlegs, Tringa melanoleuca
- Wilson's phalarope, Phalaropus tricolor
- Red-necked phalarope, Phalaropus lobatus
- Red phalarope, Phalaropus fulicarius
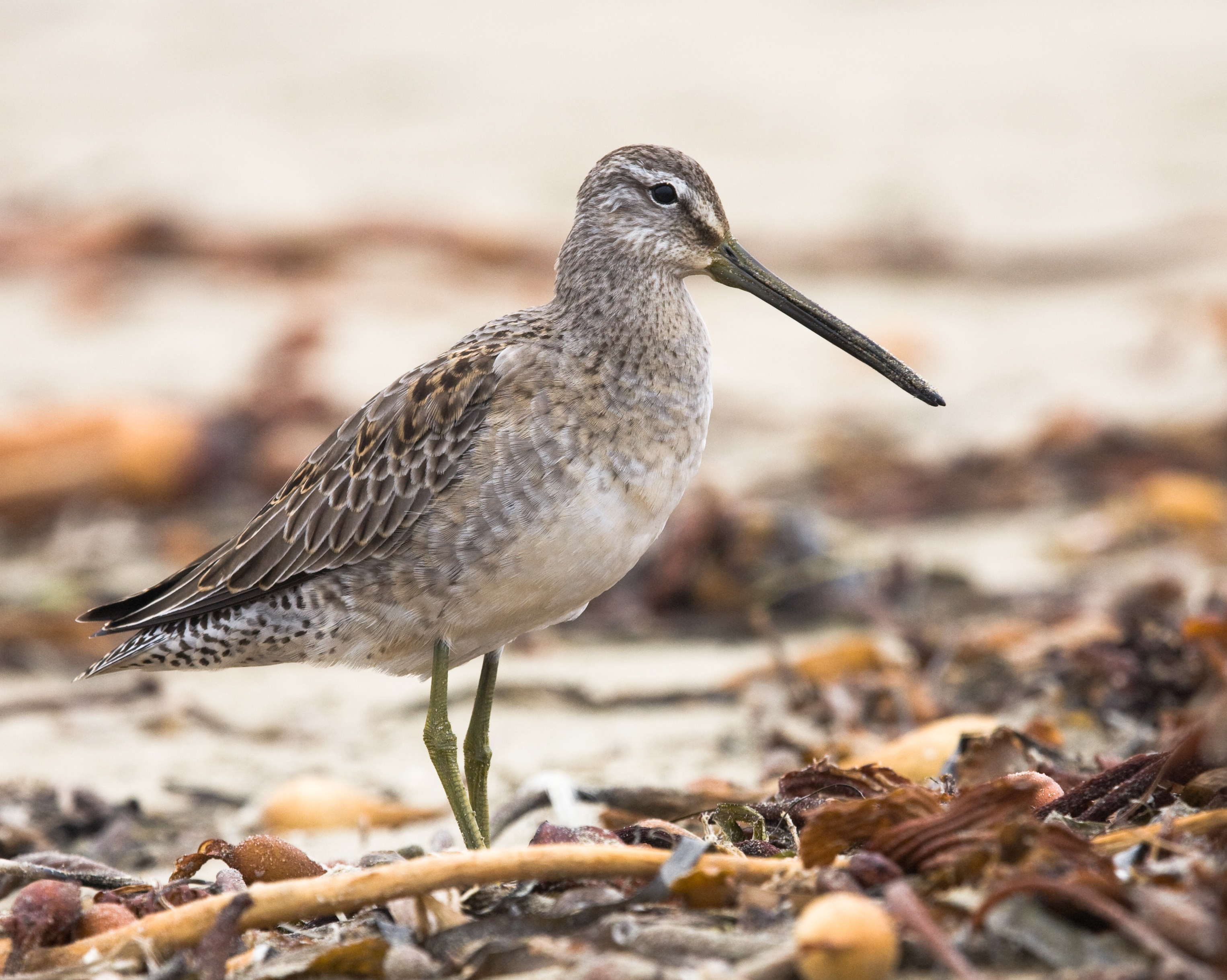
Long-billed dowitcher

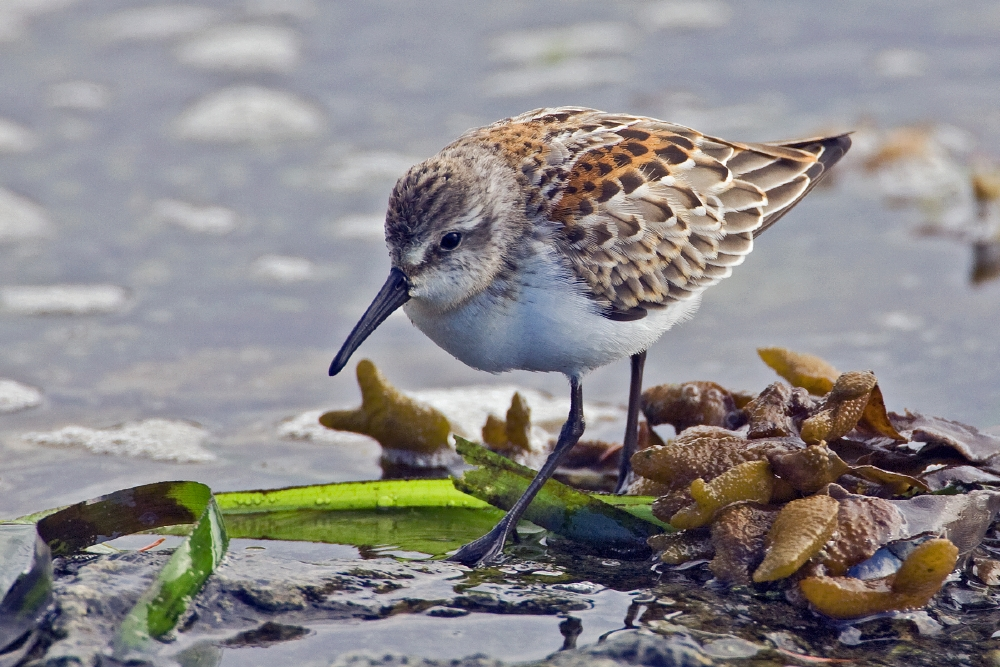
Western sandpiper

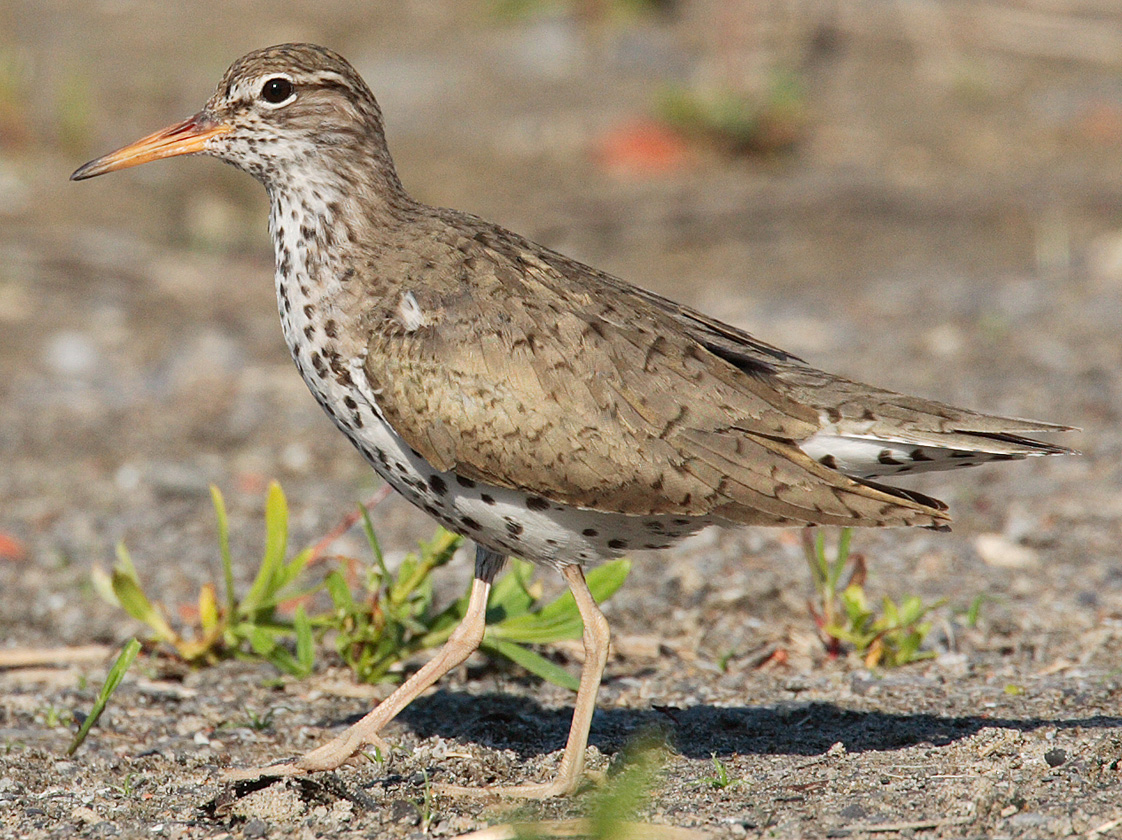
Spotted sandpiper

== Skuas and jaegers ==
Order: Charadriiformes Family: Stercorariidae

The family Stercorariidae are, in general, medium to large birds, typically with gray or brown plumage, often with white markings on the wings. They nest on the ground in temperate and arctic regions and are long-distance migrants.

- South polar skua, Stercorarius maccormicki (A)
- Pomarine jaeger, Stercorarius pomarinus
- Parasitic jaeger, Stercorarius parasiticus
- Long-tailed jaeger, Stercorarius longicaudus (A)

== Gulls, terns, and skimmers ==
Order: Charadriiformes Family: Laridae

Laridae is a family of medium to large seabirds and includes gulls, kittiwakes, terns, and skimmers. They are typically gray or white, often with black markings on the head or wings. They have longish bills and webbed feet. Terns are a group of generally medium to large seabirds typically with gray or white plumage, often with black markings on the head. Most terns hunt fish by diving but some pick insects off the surface of fresh water. Terns are generally long-lived birds, with several species known to live in excess of 30 years. Skimmers are a small family of tropical tern-like birds. They have an elongated lower mandible which they use to feed by flying low over the water surface and skimming the water for small fish.

- Swallow-tailed gull, Creagrus furcatus
- Black-legged kittiwake, Rissa tridactyla (A) (vulnerable)
- Sabine's gull, Xema sabini
- Bonaparte's gull, Chroicocephalus philadelphia (A)
- Gray-hooded gull, Chroicocephalus cirrocephalus (A)
- Gray gull, Leucophaeus modestus (A)
- Laughing gull, Leucophaeus atricilla
- Franklin's gull, Leucophaeus pipixcan
- Belcher's gull, Larus belcheri (A)
- Heermann's gull, Larus heermanni (A)
- Ring-billed gull, Larus delawarensis
- Western gull, Larus occidentalis (A)
- California gull, Larus californicus (A)
- Herring gull, Larus argentatus
- Lesser black-backed gull, Larus fuscus (A)
- Great black-backed gull, Larus marinus (A)
- Kelp gull, Larus dominicanus (A)
- Brown noddy, Anous stolidus
- Black noddy, Anous minutus
- White tern, Gygis alba
- Sooty tern, Onychoprion fuscatus
- Bridled tern, Onychoprion anaethetus
- Least tern, Sternula antillarum
- Yellow-billed Tern, Sternula superciliaris (A)
- Large-billed tern, Phaetusa simplex (A)
- Gull-billed tern, Gelochelidon nilotica
- Caspian tern, Hydroprogne caspia
- Inca tern, Larosterna inca (A)
- Black tern, Chlidonias niger
- Roseate tern, Sterna dougallii (A)
- Common tern, Sterna hirundo
- Arctic tern, Sterna paradisaea
- Forster's tern, Sterna forsteri
- Royal tern, Thalasseus maximus
- Sandwich tern, Thalasseus sandvicensis
- Elegant tern, Thalasseus elegans
- Black skimmer, Rynchops niger

== Sunbittern ==
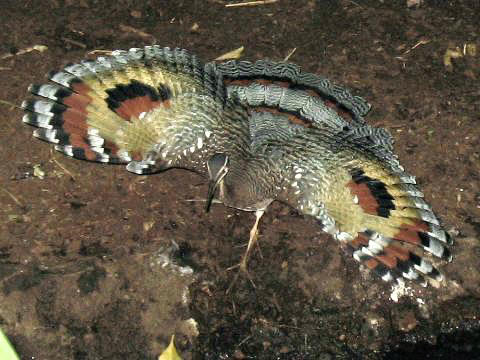
Sunbittern

Order: Eurypygiformes Family: Eurypygidae

The sunbittern is a bittern-like bird of tropical regions of the Americas and the sole member of the family Eurypygidae (sometimes spelled Eurypigidae) and genus Eurypyga.

- Sunbittern, Eurypyga helias

== Tropicbirds ==
Order: Phaethontiformes Family: Phaethontidae

Tropicbirds are slender white birds of tropical oceans which have exceptionally long central tail feathers. Their heads and long wings have black markings.

- White-tailed tropicbird, Phaethon lepturus (A)
- Red-billed tropicbird, Phaethon aethereus
- Red-tailed tropicbird, Phaethon rubricauda (A)

== Albatrosses ==
Order: Procellariiformes Family: Diomedeidae

The albatrosses are among the largest of flying birds, and the great albatrosses from the genus Diomedea have the largest wingspans of any extant birds.

- Yellow-nosed albatross, Thalassarche chlororhynchos (A) (endangered)
- Salvin's albatross, Thalassarche salvini (A)
- Waved albatross, Phoebastria irrorata (R?) (critically endangered)

== Southern storm-petrels ==
Order: Procellariiformes Family: Oceanitidae

The storm-petrels are the smallest seabirds, relatives of the petrels, feeding on planktonic crustaceans and small fish picked from the surface, typically while hovering. The flight is fluttering and sometimes bat-like. Until 2018, this family's three species were included with the other storm-petrels in family Hydrobatidae.

- Wilson's storm-petrel, Oceanites oceanicus (A)
- White-faced storm-petrel, Pelagodroma marina (A)
- White-bellied storm-petrel, Fregetta grallaria (A)

== Northern storm-petrels ==
Order: Procellariiformes Family: Hydrobatidae

Though the members of this family are similar in many respects to the southern storm-petrels, including their general appearance and habits, there are enough genetic differences to warrant their placement in a separate family.

- Leach's storm-petrel, Hydrobates leucorhous (vulnerable)
- Band-rumped storm-petrel, Hydrobates castro (A)
- Wedge-rumped storm-petrel, Hydrobates tethys
- Black storm-petrel, Hydrobates melania
- Markham's storm-petrel, Hydrobates markhami
- Least storm-petrel, Hydrobates microsoma

== Shearwaters and petrels ==
Order: Procellariiformes Family: Procellariidae

The procellariids are the main group of medium-sized "true petrels", characterized by united nostrils with medium septum and a long outer functional primary.

- Black-capped petrel, Pterodroma hasitata (A)
- Galapagos petrel, Pterodroma phaeopygia (critically endangered)
- Tahiti petrel, Pterodroma rostrata
- Spectacled petrel, Procellaria conspicillata (A) (vulnerable)
- Parkinson's petrel, Procellaria parkinsoni (vulnerable)
- Cory's shearwater, Calonectris diomedea (A)
- Wedge-tailed shearwater, Ardenna pacifica
- Short-tailed shearwater, Ardenna tenuirostris
- Sooty shearwater, Ardenna grisea (A)
- Great shearwater, Ardenna gravis (A)
- Pink-footed shearwater, Ardenna creatopus (vulnerable)
- Christmas shearwater, Puffinus nativitatis
- Galapagos shearwater, Puffinus subalaris
- Manx shearwater, Puffinus puffinus (A)
- Black-vented shearwater, Puffinus opisthomelas (A)
- Sargasso shearwater, Puffinus lherminieri

== Storks ==
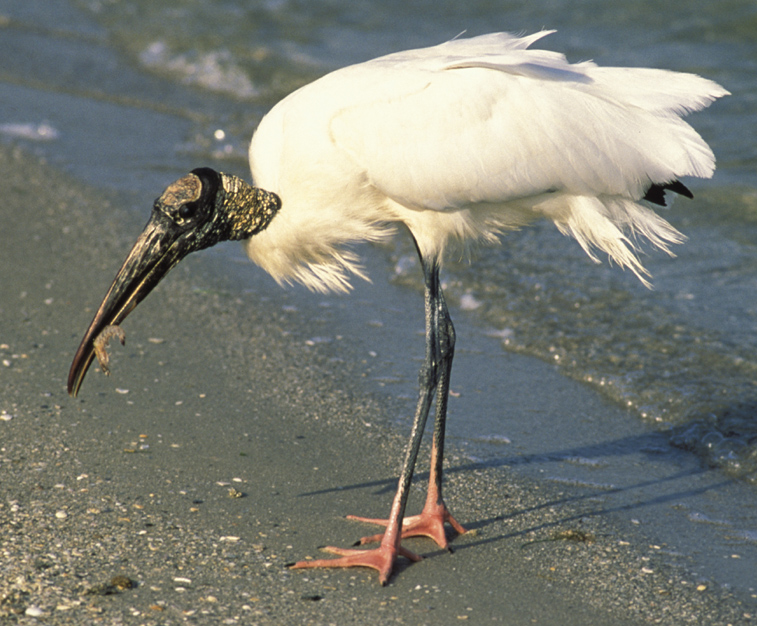
Wood stork

Order: Ciconiiformes Family: Ciconiidae

Storks are large, long-legged, long-necked wading birds with long, stout bills. Storks are mute, but bill-clattering is an important mode of communication at the nest. Their nests can be large and may be reused for many years. Many species are migratory.

- Maguari stork, Ciconia maguari (A)
- Jabiru, Jabiru mycteria
- Wood stork, Mycteria americana

== Frigatebirds ==
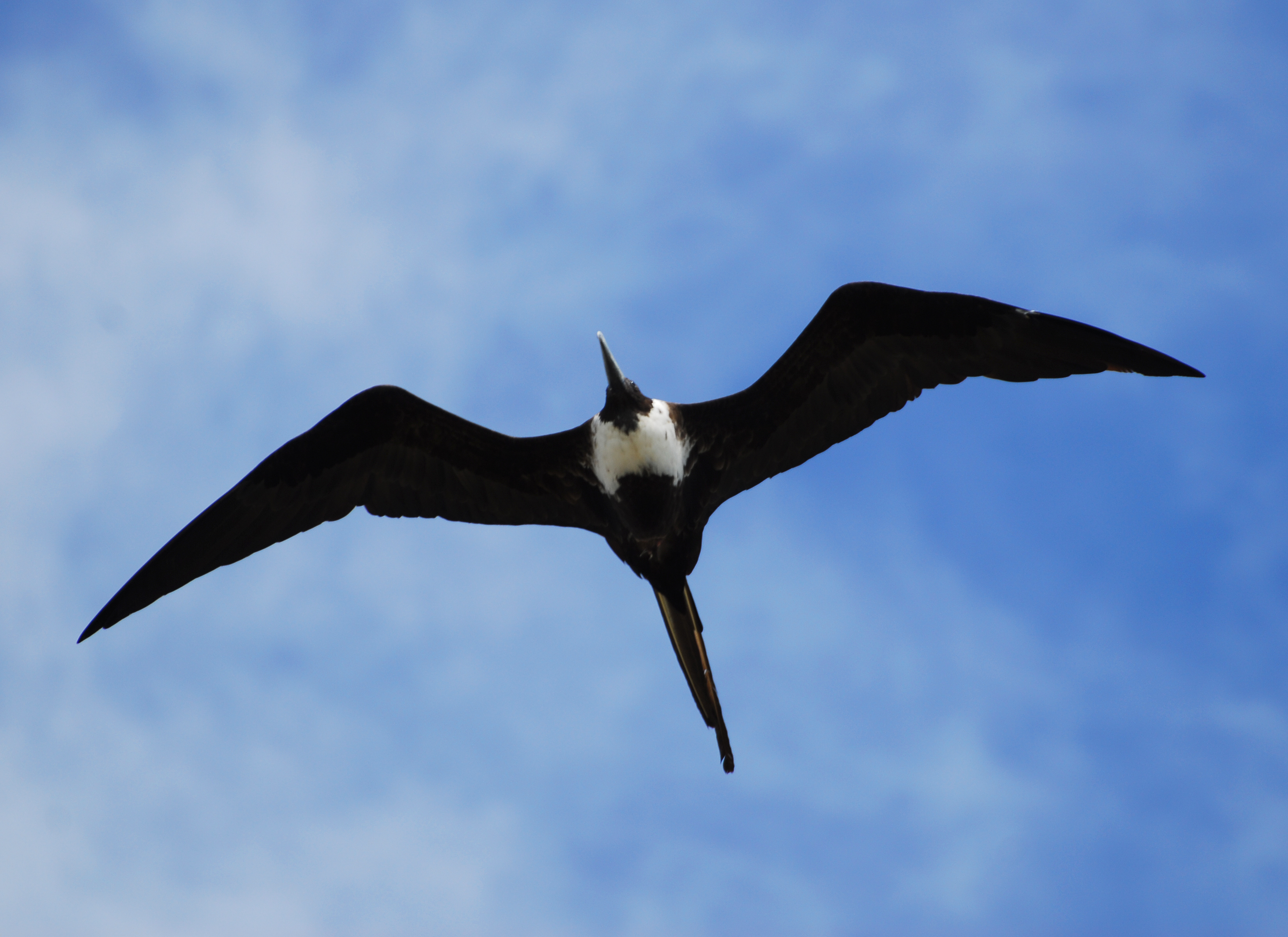
Magnificent frigatebird

Order: Suliformes Family: Fregatidae

Frigatebirds are large seabirds usually found over tropical oceans. They are large, black-and-white or completely black, with long wings and deeply forked tails. The males have colored inflatable throat pouches. They do not swim or walk and cannot take off from a flat surface. Having the largest wingspan-to-body-weight ratio of any bird, they are essentially aerial, able to stay aloft for more than a week.

- Magnificent frigatebird, Fregata magnificens
- Great frigatebird, Fregata minor

== Boobies and gannets ==
Order: Suliformes Family: Sulidae

The sulids comprise the gannets and boobies. Both groups are medium to large coastal seabirds that plunge-dive for fish.

- Masked booby, Sula dactylatra
- Nazca booby, Sula granti
- Blue-footed booby, Sula nebouxii
- Peruvian booby, Sula variegata (A)
- Brown booby, Sula leucogaster
- Cocos booby, Sula brewsteri
- Red-footed booby, Sula sula

== Anhingas ==
Order: Suliformes Family: Anhingidae

Anhingas are often called "snake-birds" because of their long thin neck, which gives a snake-like appearance when they swim with their bodies submerged. The males have black and dark-brown plumage, an erectile crest on the nape, and a larger bill than the female. The females have much paler plumage especially on the neck and underparts. The anhingas have completely webbed feet and their legs are short and set far back on the body. Their plumage is somewhat permeable, like that of cormorants, and they spread their wings to dry after diving.

- Anhinga, Anhinga anhinga

== Cormorants and shags ==
Order: Suliformes Family: Phalacrocoracidae

Phalacrocoracidae is a family of medium to large coastal, fish-eating seabirds that includes cormorants and shags. Plumage coloration varies, with the majority having mainly dark plumage, some species being black-and-white, and a few being colorful.

- Neotropic cormorant, Nannopterum brasilianum

== Pelicans ==
Order: Pelecaniformes Family: Pelecanidae

Pelicans are large water birds with a distinctive pouch under their beak. As with other members of the order Pelecaniformes, they have webbed feet with four toes.

- American white pelican, Pelecanus erythrorhynchos (A)
- Brown pelican, Pelecanus occidentalis

== Herons, egrets, and bitterns ==
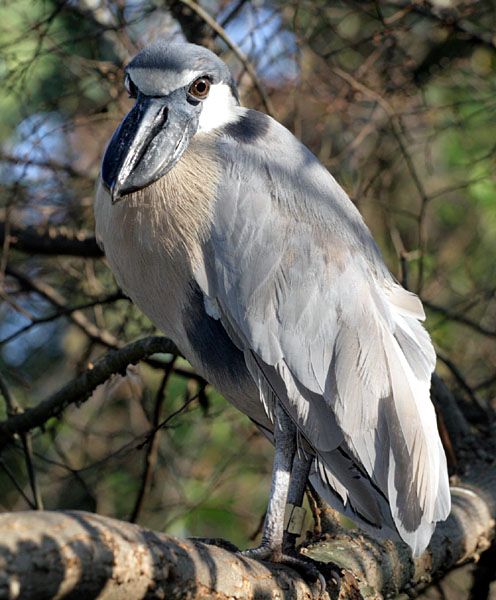
Boat-billed heron

Order: Pelecaniformes Family: Ardeidae

The family Ardeidae contains the bitterns, herons, and egrets. Herons and egrets are medium to large wading birds with long necks and legs. Bitterns tend to be shorter necked and more wary. Members of Ardeidae fly with their necks retracted, unlike other long-necked birds such as storks, ibises and spoonbills.

- Pinnated bittern, Botaurus pinnatus
- American bittern, Botaurus lentiginosus
- Least bittern, Ixobrychus exilis
- Rufescent tiger-heron, Tigrisoma lineatum
- Fasciated tiger-heron, Tigrisoma fasciatum
- Bare-throated tiger-heron, Tigrisoma mexicanum
- Great blue heron, Ardea herodias
- Great egret, Ardea alba
- Whistling heron, Syrigma sibilatrix (A) (R?)
- Snowy egret, Egretta thula
- Little blue heron, Egretta caerulea
- Tricolored heron, Egretta tricolor
- Reddish egret, Egretta rufescens
- Cattle egret, Bubulcus ibis
- Green heron, Butorides virescens
- Striated heron, Butorides striata (A)
- Agami heron, Agamia agami (vulnerable)
- Black-crowned night-heron, Nycticorax nycticorax
- Yellow-crowned night-heron, Nyctanassa violacea
- Boat-billed heron, Cochlearius cochlearius

== Ibises and spoonbills ==
Order: Pelecaniformes Family: Threskiornithidae

Threskiornithidae is a family of large terrestrial and wading birds which includes the ibises and spoonbills. They have long, broad wings with 11 primary and about 20 secondary feathers. They are strong fliers and despite their size and weight, very capable soarers.

- White ibis, Eudocimus albus
- Glossy ibis, Plegadis falcinellus
- White-faced ibis, Plegadis chihi (A)
- Green ibis, Mesembrinibis cayennensis
- Bare-faced ibis, Phimosus infuscatus (A)
- Roseate spoonbill, Platalea ajaja

== New World vultures ==
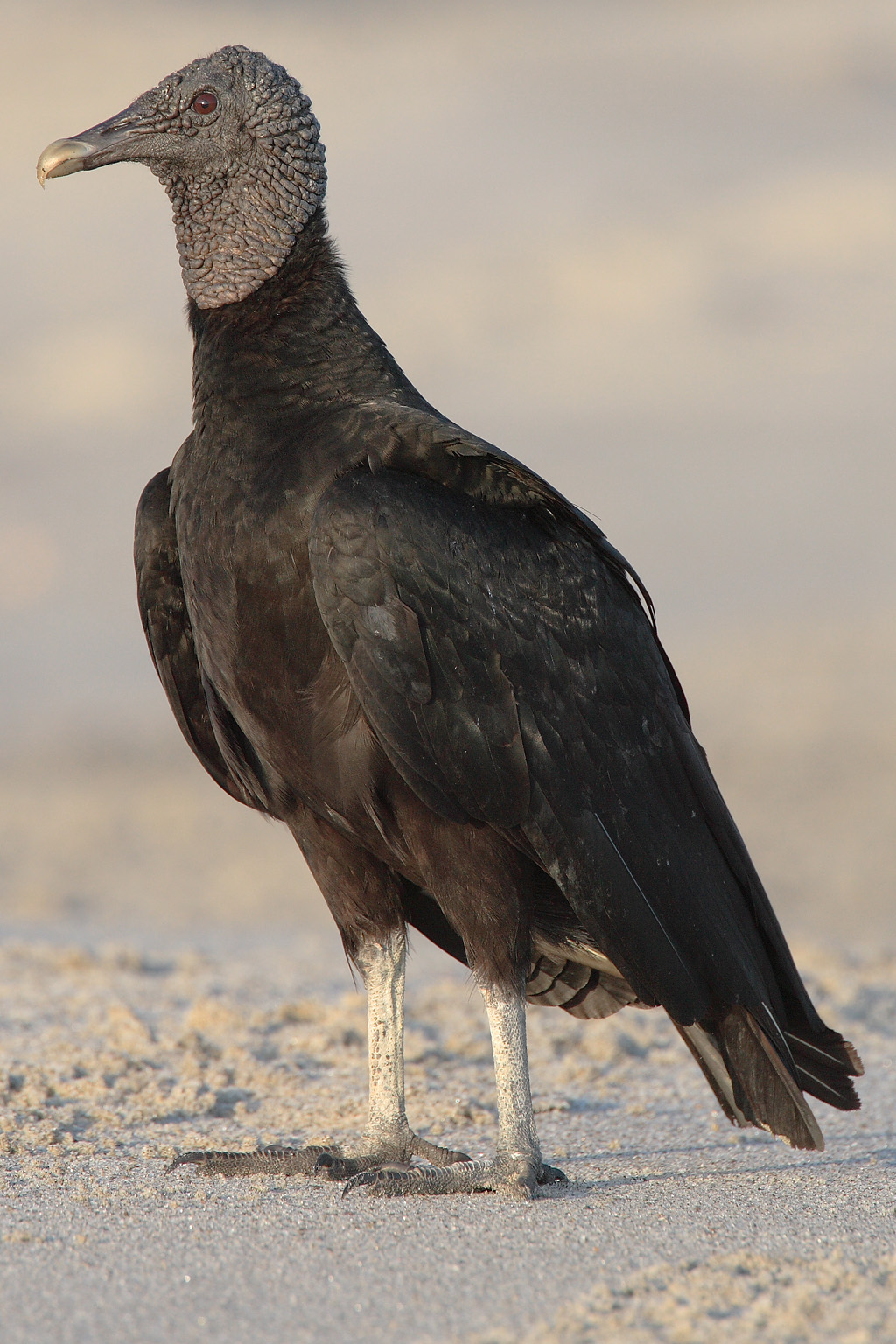
Black vulture

Order: Cathartiformes Family: Cathartidae

The New World vultures are not closely related to Old World vultures, but superficially resemble them because of convergent evolution. Like the Old World vultures, they are scavengers. However, unlike Old World vultures, which find carcasses by sight, New World vultures have a good sense of smell with which they locate carrion.

- King vulture, Sarcoramphus papa
- Black vulture, Coragyps atratus
- Turkey vulture, Cathartes aura
- Lesser yellow-headed vulture, Cathartes burrovianus

== Osprey ==
Order: Accipitriformes Family: Pandionidae

The family Pandionidae contains only one species, the osprey. The osprey is a medium-large raptor which is a specialist fish-eater with a worldwide distribution.

- Osprey, Pandion haliaetus

== Hawks, eagles, and kites ==
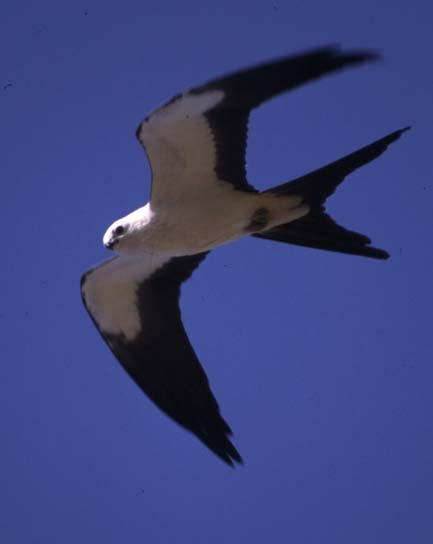
Swallow-tailed kite

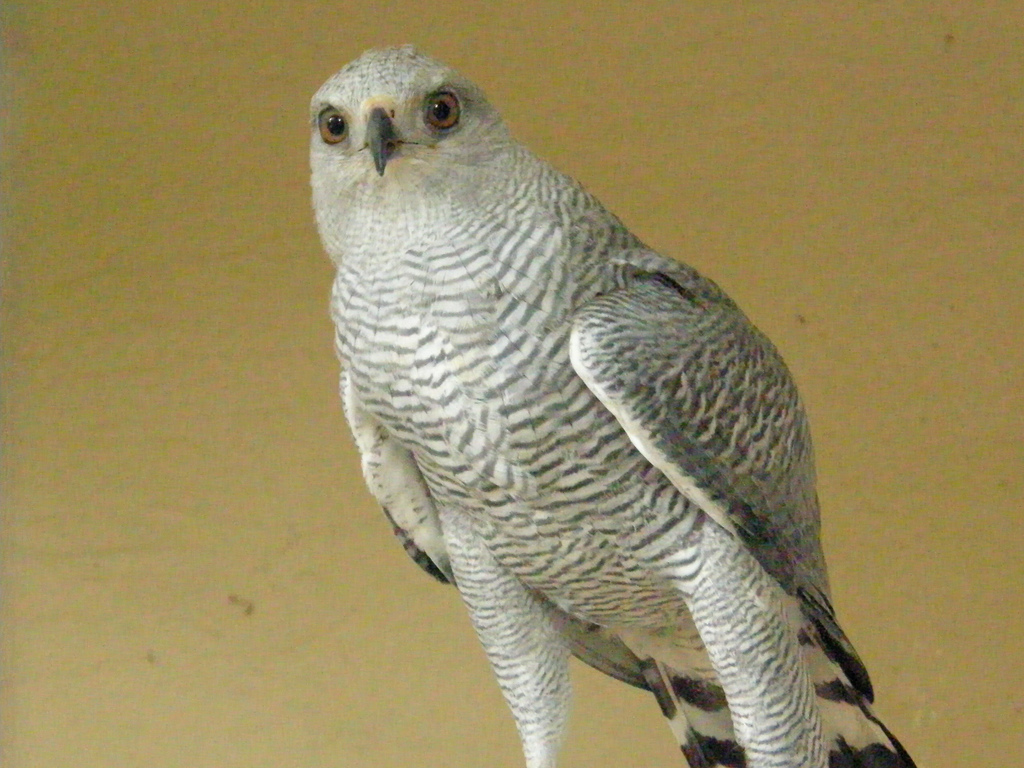
Gray-lined hawk

Order: Accipitriformes Family: Accipitridae

Accipitridae is a family of birds of prey, which includes hawks, eagles, kites, harriers, and Old World vultures. These birds have powerful hooked beaks for tearing flesh from their prey, strong legs, powerful talons, and keen eyesight.

- Pearl kite, Gampsonyx swainsonii
- White-tailed kite, Elanus leucurus
- Hook-billed kite, Chondrohierax uncinatus
- Gray-headed kite, Leptodon cayanensis
- Swallow-tailed kite, Elanoides forficatus
- Crested eagle, Morphnus guianensis
- Harpy eagle, Harpia harpyja
- Black hawk-eagle, Spizaetus tyrannus
- Black-and-white hawk-eagle, Spizaetus melanoleucus
- Ornate hawk-eagle, Spizaetus ornatus
- Double-toothed kite, Harpagus bidentatus
- Northern harrier, Circus hudsonius
- Gray-bellied hawk, Accipiter poliogaster (R?)
- Tiny hawk, Accipiter superciliosus
- Sharp-shinned hawk, Accipiter striatus
- Cooper's hawk, Accipiter cooperii
- Bicolored hawk, Accipiter bicolor
- Mississippi kite, Ictinia mississippiensis
- Black-collared hawk, Busarellus nigricollis
- Crane hawk, Geranospiza caerulescens
- Snail kite, Rostrhamus sociabilis
- Plumbeous hawk, Cryptoleucopteryx plumbea
- Common black hawk, Buteogallus anthracinus
- Savanna hawk, Buteogallus meridionalis
- Great black hawk, Buteogallus urubitinga
- Solitary eagle, Buteogallus solitarius
- Barred hawk, Morphnarchus princeps
- Roadside hawk, Rupornis magnirostris
- Harris's hawk, Parabuteo unicinctus
- White-tailed hawk, Geranoaetus albicaudatus
- White hawk, Pseudastur albicollis
- Semiplumbeous hawk, Leucopternis semiplumbeus
- Gray hawk, Buteo plagiatus
- Gray-lined hawk, Buteo nitidus
- Broad-winged hawk, Buteo platypterus
- Short-tailed hawk, Buteo brachyurus
- Swainson's hawk, Buteo swainsoni
- Zone-tailed hawk, Buteo albonotatus
- Red-tailed hawk, Buteo jamaicensis

== Barn-owls ==
Order: Strigiformes Family: Tytonidae

Barn-owls are medium to large owls with large heads and characteristic heart-shaped faces. They have long strong legs with powerful talons.

- Barn owl, Tyto alba

== Owls ==
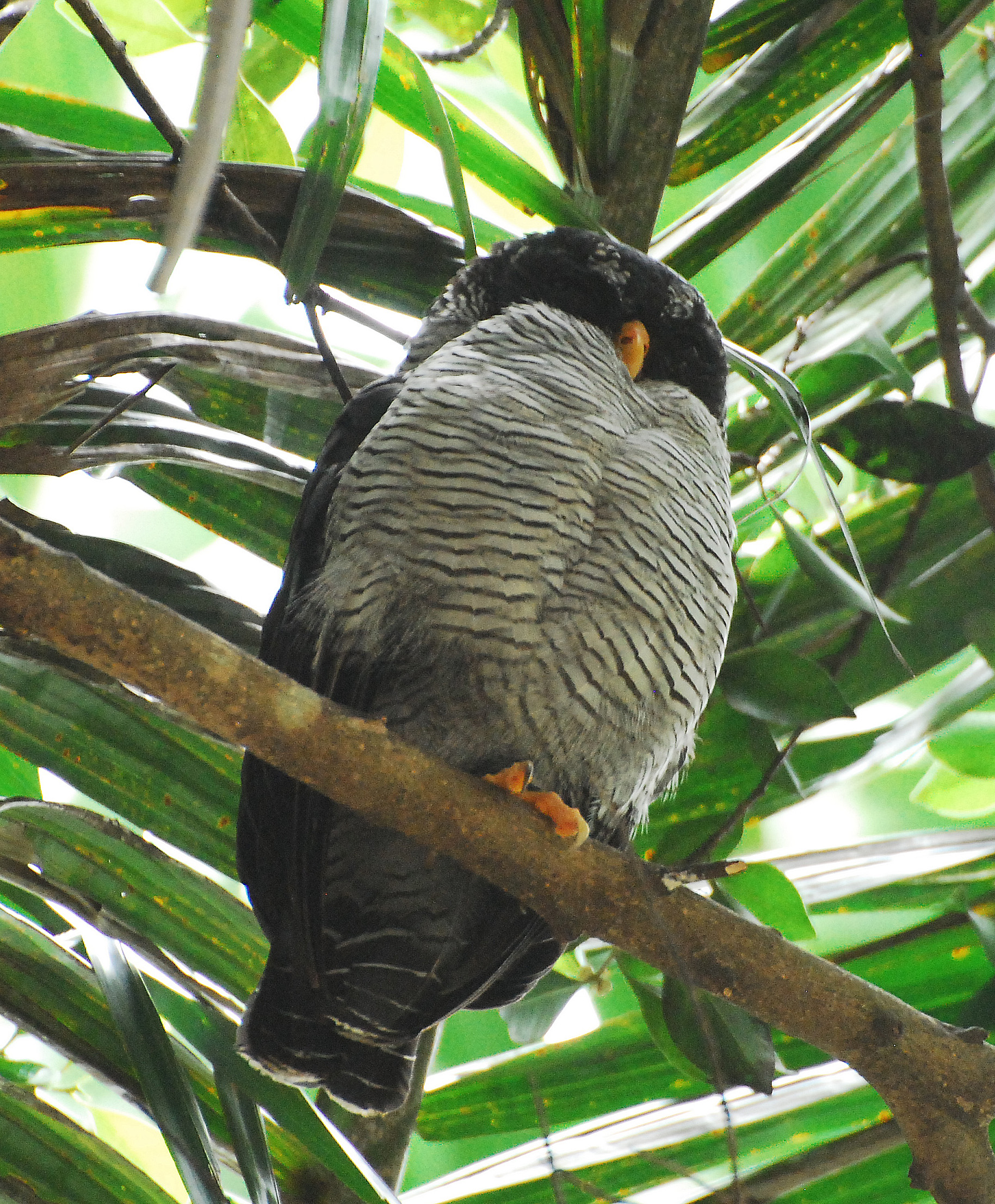
Black-and-white owl

Order: Strigiformes Family: Strigidae

The typical owls are small to large solitary nocturnal birds of prey. They have large forward-facing eyes and ears, a hawk-like beak, and a conspicuous circle of feathers around each eye called a facial disk.

- Bare-shanked screech-owl, Megascops clarkii
- Tropical screech-owl, Megascops choliba
- Pacific screech-owl, Megascops cooperi
- Middle-American screech-owl, Megascops guatemalae
- Choco screech-owl, Megascops centralis
- Crested owl, Lophostrix cristata
- Spectacled owl, Pulsatrix perspicillata
- Great horned owl, Bubo virginianus
- Costa Rican pygmy-owl, Glaucidium costaricanum (E-R)
- Central American pygmy-owl, Glaucidium griseiceps
- Ferruginous pygmy-owl, Glaucidium brasilianum
- Burrowing owl, Athene cunicularia (A)
- Mottled owl, Strix virgata
- Black-and-white owl, Strix nigrolineata
- Short-eared owl, Asio flammeus (A)
- Striped owl, Asio clamator
- Unspotted saw-whet owl, Aegolius ridgwayi

== Trogons ==
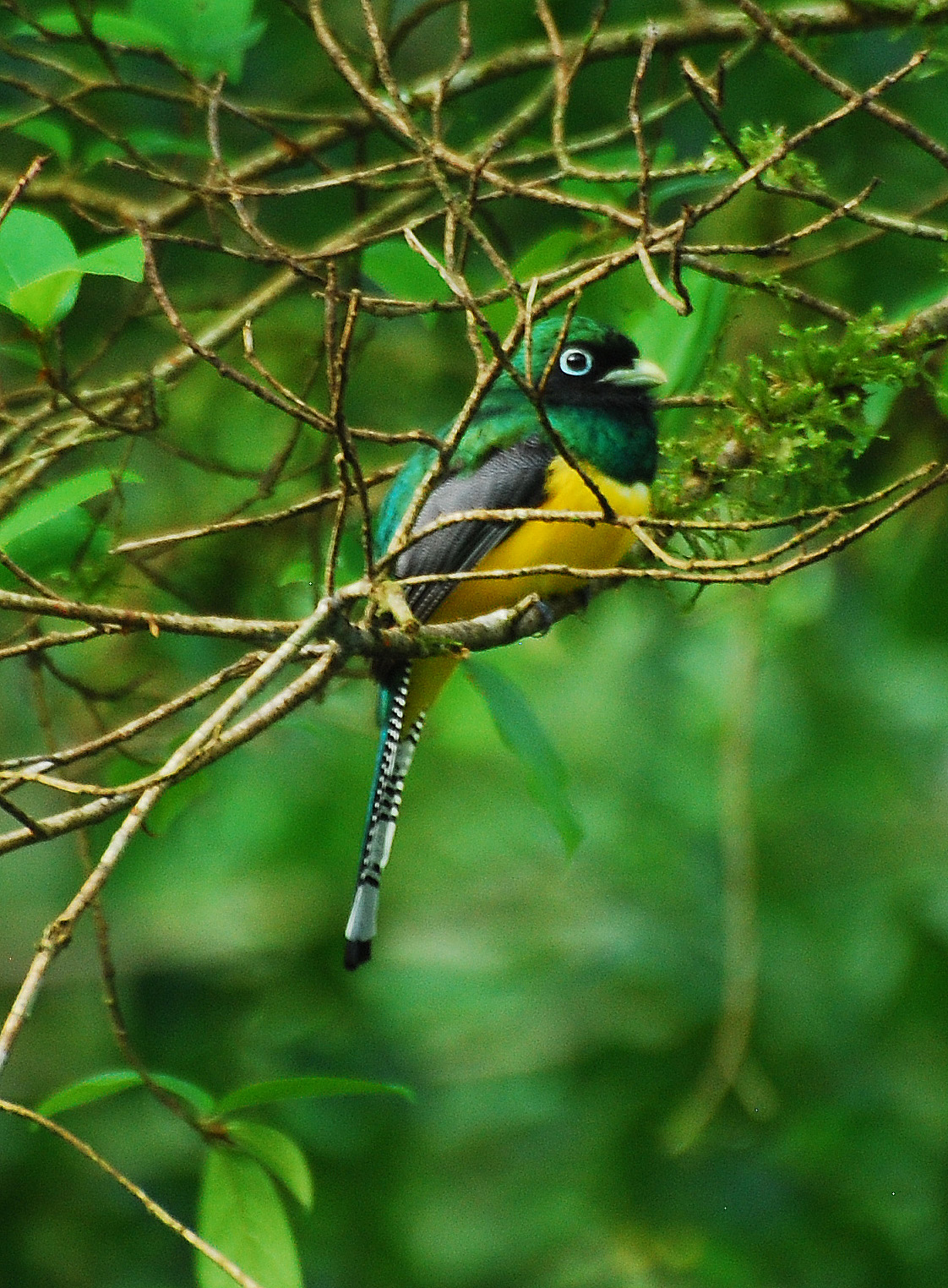
Black-throated trogon

Order: Trogoniformes Family: Trogonidae

The family Trogonidae includes trogons and quetzals. Found in tropical woodlands worldwide, they feed on insects and fruit, and their broad bills and weak legs reflect their diet and arboreal habits. Although their flight is fast, they are reluctant to fly any distance. Trogons have soft, often colorful, feathers with distinctive male and female plumage.

- Lattice-tailed trogon, Trogon clathratus (E-R)
- Slaty-tailed trogon, Trogon massena
- Black-headed trogon, Trogon melanocephalus
- Baird's trogon, Trogon bairdii (E-R)
- Gartered trogon, Trogon caligatus
- Northern black-throated trogon, Trogon tenellus
- Elegant trogon, Trogon elegans
- Collared trogon, Trogon collaris
- Resplendent quetzal, Pharomachrus mocinno

== Motmots ==
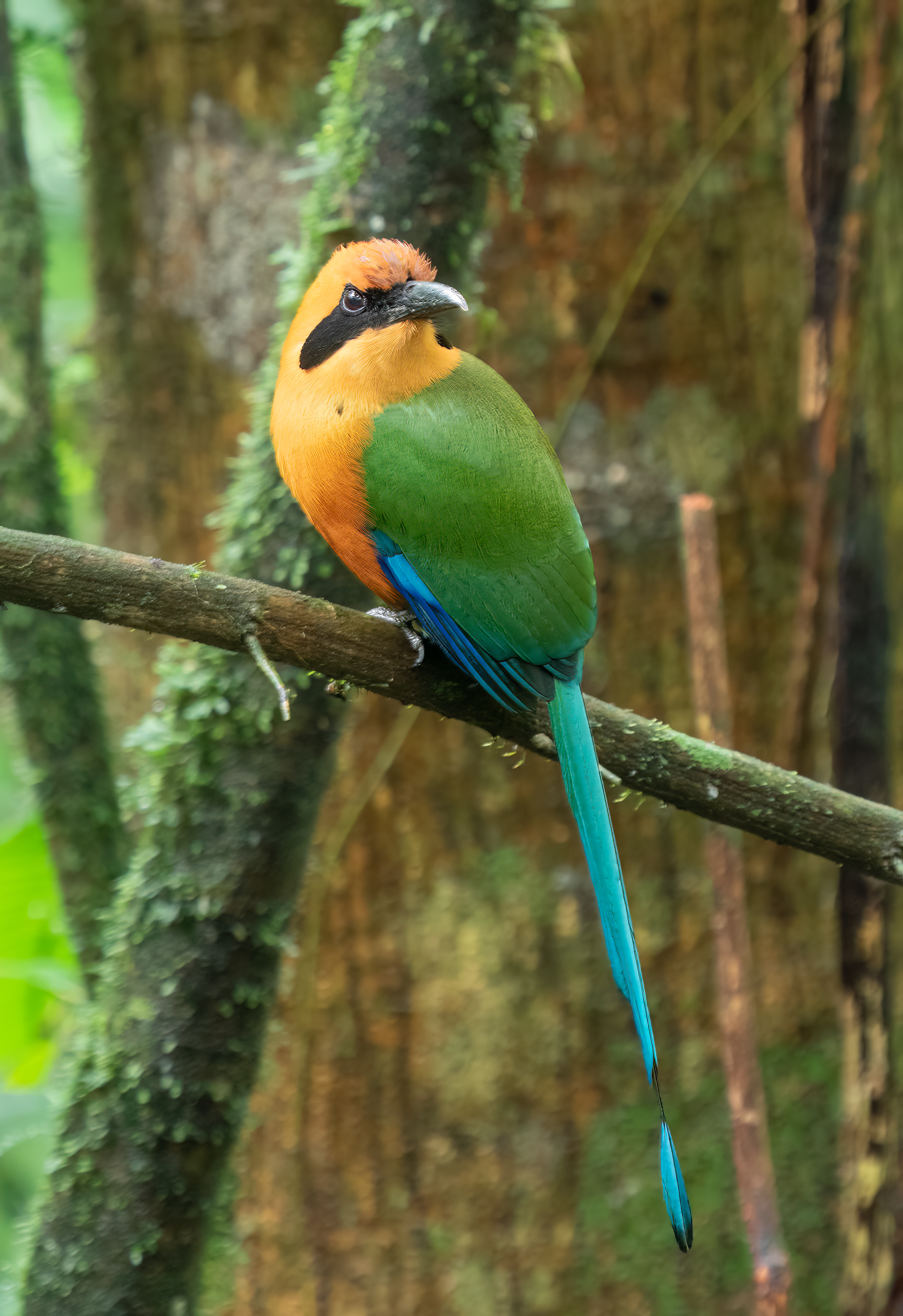
Rufous motmot in La Fortuna

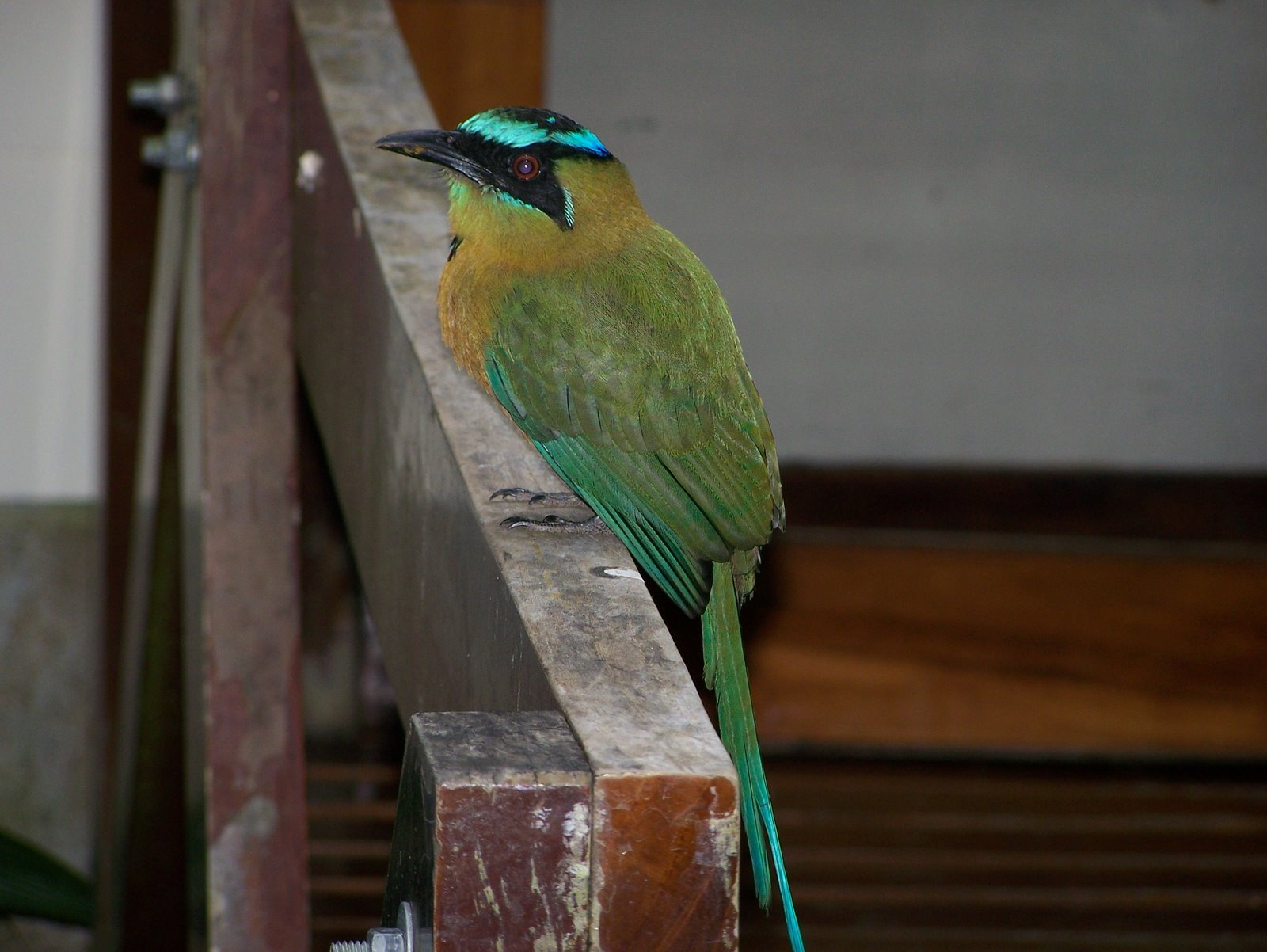
Lesson's motmot

Order: Coraciiformes Family: Momotidae

The motmots have colorful plumage and long, graduated tails which they display by waggling back and forth. In most of the species, the barbs near the ends of the two longest (central) tail feathers are weak and fall off, leaving a length of bare shaft and creating a racket-shaped tail.

- Tody motmot, Hylomanes momotula
- Lesson's motmot, Momotus lessonii
- Rufous motmot, Baryphthengus martii
- Keel-billed motmot, Electron carinatum (vulnerable)
- Broad-billed motmot, Electron platyrhynchum
- Turquoise-browed motmot, Eumomota superciliosa

== Kingfishers ==
Order: Coraciiformes Family: Alcedinidae

Kingfishers are medium-sized birds with large heads, long, pointed bills, short legs, and stubby tails.

- Ringed kingfisher, Megaceryle torquatus
- Belted kingfisher, Megaceryle alcyon
- Amazon kingfisher, Chloroceryle amazona
- American pygmy kingfisher, Chloroceryle aenea
- Green kingfisher, Chloroceryle americana
- Green-and-rufous kingfisher, Chloroceryle inda

== Puffbirds ==
Order: Piciformes Family: Bucconidae

The puffbirds are related to the jacamars and have the same range, but lack the iridescent colors of that family. They are mainly brown, rufous, or gray, with large heads and flattened bills with hooked tips. The loose abundant plumage and short tails makes them look stout and puffy, giving rise to the English common name of the family.

- White-necked puffbird, Notharchus hyperrhynchus
- Pied puffbird, Notharchus tectus
- White-whiskered puffbird, Malacoptila panamensis
- Lanceolated monklet, Micromonacha lanceolata
- White-fronted nunbird, Monasa morphoeus

== Jacamars ==
Order: Piciformes Family: Galbulidae

The jacamars are near passerine birds from tropical South America, with a range that extends up to Mexico. They feed on insects caught on the wing, and are glossy, elegant birds with long bills and tails. In appearance and behavior they resemble the Old World bee-eaters, although they are more closely related to puffbirds.

- Rufous-tailed jacamar, Galbula ruficauda
- Great jacamar, Jacamerops aureus

== New World barbets ==
Order: Piciformes Family: Capitonidae

The barbets are plump birds, with short necks and large heads. They get their name from the bristles which fringe their heavy bills. Most species are brightly colored.

- Red-headed barbet, Eubucco bourcierii

== Toucan-barbets ==
Order: Piciformes Family: Semnornithidae

The toucan-barbets are birds of montane forests in the Neotropics. They are highly social and non-migratory.

- Prong-billed barbet, Semnornis frantzii (E-R)

== Toucans ==
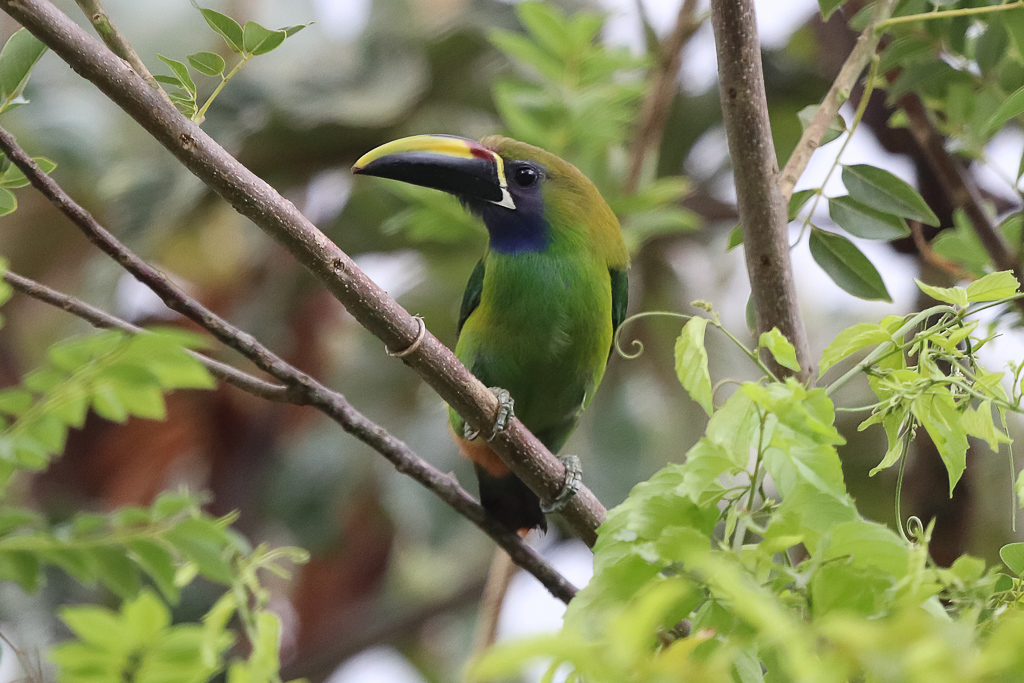
Northern emerald-toucanet

Order: Piciformes Family: Ramphastidae

Toucans are near passerine birds from the Neotropics. They are brightly marked and have enormous, colorful bills which in some species amount to half their body length.

- Northern emerald-toucanet, Aulacorhynchus prasinus
- Collared aracari, Pteroglossus torquatus
- Fiery-billed aracari, Pteroglossus frantzii (E-R)
- Yellow-eared toucanet, Selenidera spectabilis
- Keel-billed toucan, Ramphastos sulfuratus
- Yellow-throated toucan, Ramphastos ambiguus

== Woodpeckers ==
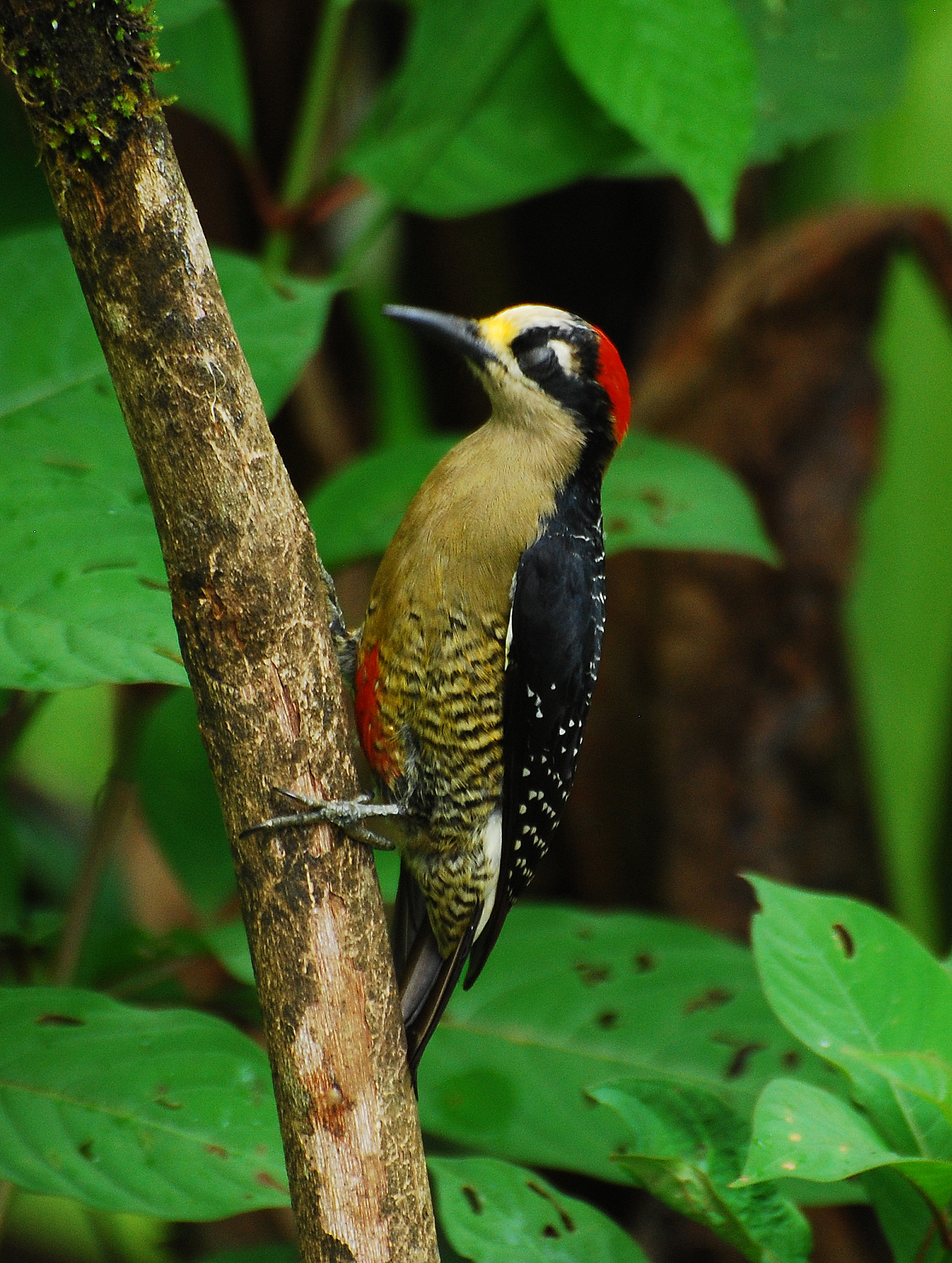
Black-cheeked woodpecker

Order: Piciformes Family: Picidae

Woodpeckers are small to medium-sized birds with chisel-like beaks, short legs, stiff tails, and long tongues used for capturing insects. Some species have feet with two toes pointing forward and two backward, while several species have only three toes. Many woodpeckers have the habit of tapping noisily on tree trunks with their beaks.

- Olivaceous piculet, Picumnus olivaceus
- Acorn woodpecker, Melanerpes formicivorus
- Golden-naped woodpecker, Melanerpes chrysauchen (E-R)
- Black-cheeked woodpecker, Melanerpes pucherani
- Red-crowned woodpecker, Melanerpes rubricapillus
- Hoffmann's woodpecker, Melanerpes hoffmannii
- Yellow-bellied sapsucker, Sphyrapicus varius
- Smoky-brown woodpecker, Drobates fumigatus
- Hairy woodpecker, Picoides villosus
- Red-rumped woodpecker, Veniliornis kirkii
- Rufous-winged woodpecker, Piculus simplex (E-R)
- Golden-olive woodpecker, Colaptes rubiginosus
- Cinnamon woodpecker, Celeus loricatus
- Chestnut-colored woodpecker, Celeus castaneus
- Lineated woodpecker, Dryocopus lineatus
- Pale-billed woodpecker, Campephilus guatemalensis

== Falcons and caracaras ==
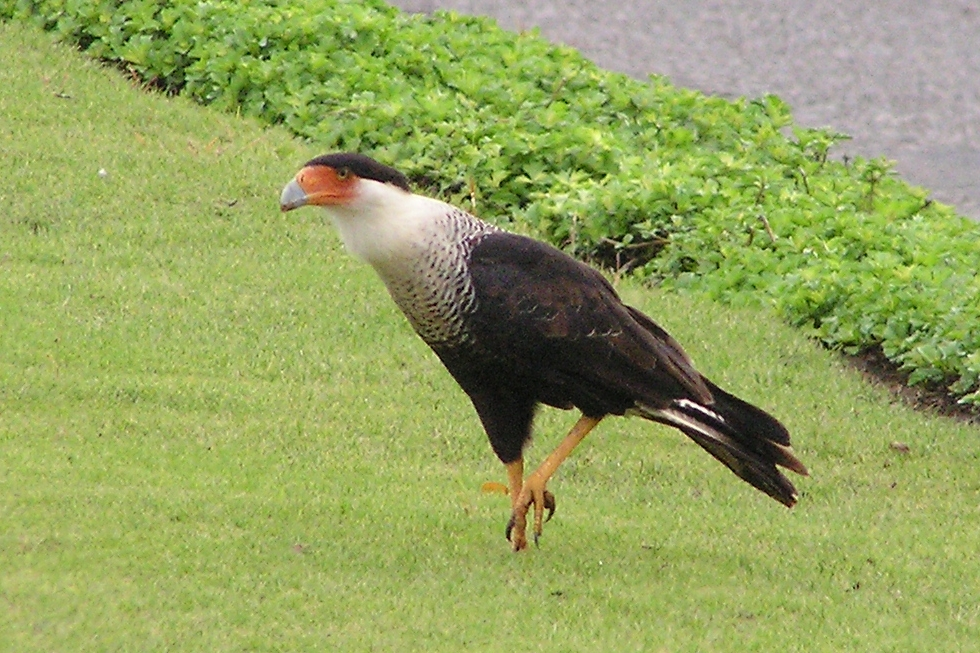
Crested caracara

Order: Falconiformes Family: Falconidae

Falconidae is a family of diurnal birds of prey. They differ from hawks, eagles, and kites in that they kill with their beaks instead of their talons.

- Laughing falcon, Herpetotheres cachinnans
- Barred forest-falcon, Micrastur ruficollis
- Slaty-backed forest-falcon, Micrastur mirandollei
- Collared forest-falcon, Micrastur semitorquatus
- Red-throated caracara, Ibycter americanus
- Crested caracara, Caracara plancus
- Yellow-headed caracara, Milvago chimachima
- American kestrel, Falco sparverius
- Merlin, Falco columbarius
- Aplomado falcon, Falco femoralis
- Bat falcon, Falco rufigularis
- Orange-breasted falcon, Falco deiroleucus (R?)
- Peregrine falcon, Falco peregrinus

== New World and African parrots ==
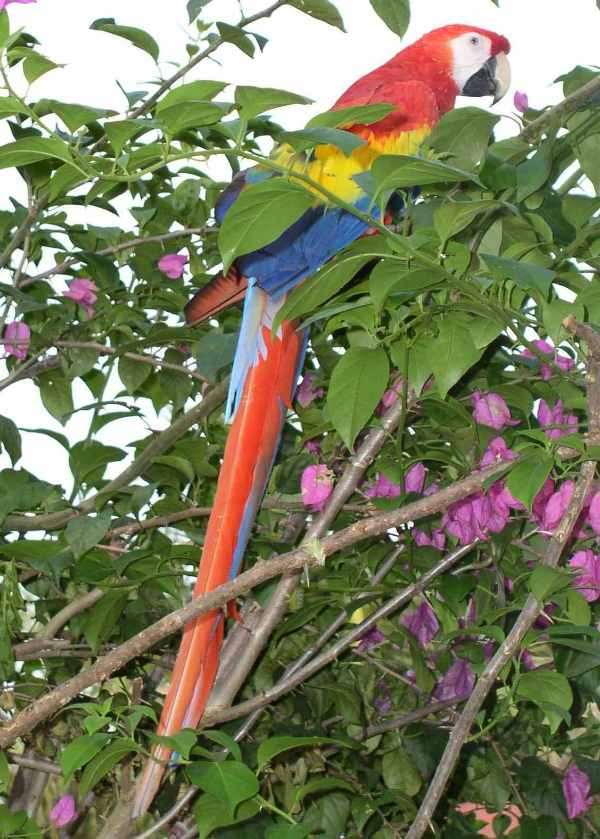
Scarlet macaw

Order: Psittaciformes Family: Psittacidae

Parrots are small to large birds with a characteristic curved beak. Their upper mandibles have slight mobility in the joint with the skull and they have a generally erect stance. All parrots are zygodactyl, having the four toes on each foot placed two at the front and two to the back.

- Sulphur-winged parakeet, Pyrrhura hoffmanni (E-R)
- Olive-throated parakeet, Eupsittula nana
- Orange-fronted parakeet, Eupsittula canicularis
- Brown-throated parakeet, Eupsittula pertinax
- Scarlet macaw, Ara macao
- Great green macaw, Ara ambigua (endangered)
- Crimson-fronted parakeet, Psittacara finschi
- Barred parakeet, Bolborhynchus lineola
- Orange-chinned parakeet, Brotogeris jugularis
- Red-fronted parrotlet, Touit costaricensis (E-R) (vulnerable)
- Brown-hooded parrot, Pyrilia haematotis
- Blue-headed parrot, Pionus menstruus
- White-crowned parrot, Pionus senilis
- White-fronted parrot, Amazona albifrons
- Red-lored parrot, Amazona autumnalis
- Mealy parrot, Amazona farinosa
- Yellow-naped parrot, Amazona auropalliata (endangered)
- Yellow-crowned Parrot, Amazona ochrocephala

== Manakins ==
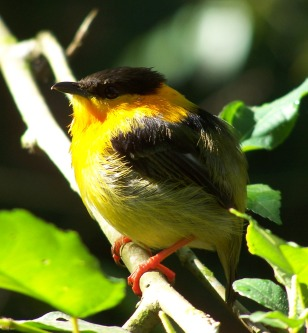
Orange-collared manakin

Order: Passeriformes Family: Pipridae

The manakins are a family of subtropical and tropical mainland Central and South America, and Trinidad and Tobago. They are compact forest birds, the males typically being brightly colored, although the females of most species are duller and usually green-plumaged. Manakins feed on small fruits, berries, and insects.

- Lance-tailed manakin, Chiroxiphia lanceolata
- Long-tailed manakin, Chiroxiphia linearis
- White-ruffed manakin, Corapipo altera
- White-bibbed manakin, Corapipo leucorrhoa (A)
- Blue-capped manakin, Lepidothrix coronata
- White-collared manakin, Manacus candei
- Orange-collared manakin, Manacus aurantiacus (E-R)
- White-crowned manakin, pseudopipra pipra
- Red-capped manakin, Ceratopipra mentalis

== Cotingas ==
Order: Passeriformes Family: Cotingidae

The cotingas are birds of forests or forest edges in tropical South America. Comparatively little is known about this diverse group, although all have broad bills with hooked tips, rounded wings, and strong legs. The males of many of the species are brightly colored or decorated with plumes or wattles.

- Purple-throated fruitcrow, Querula purpurata
- Bare-necked umbrellabird, Cephalopterus glabricollis (E-R) (endangered)
- Lovely cotinga, Cotinga amabilis
- Turquoise cotinga, Cotinga ridgwayi (E-R) (vulnerable)
- Rufous piha, Lipaugus unirufus
- Three-wattled bellbird, Procnias tricarunculata (vulnerable)
- Yellow-billed cotinga, Carpodectes antoniae (E-R) (endangered)
- Snowy cotinga, Carpodectes nitidus

== Tityras and allies ==
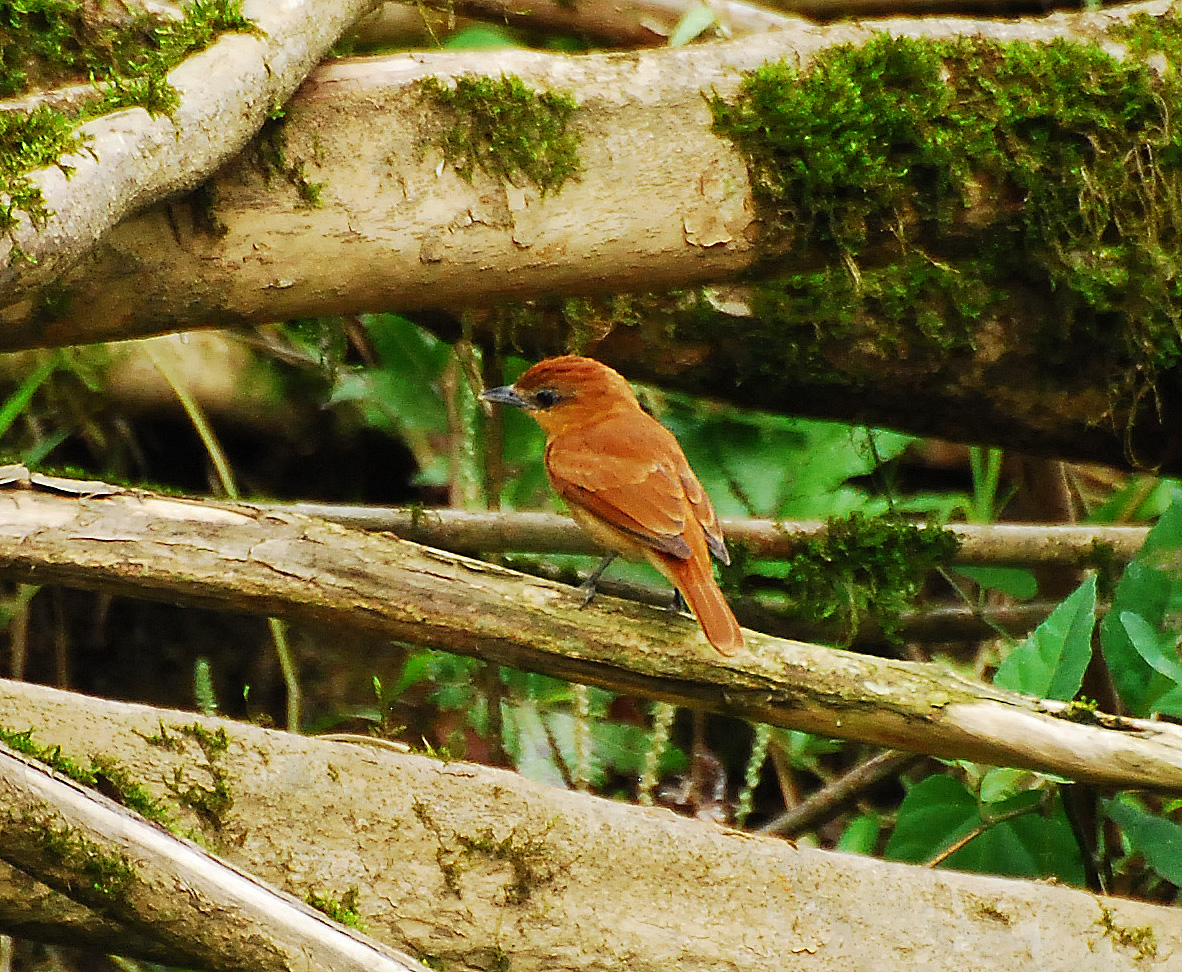
Cinnamon becard

Order: Passeriformes Family: Tityridae

Tityridae are suboscine passerine birds found in forest and woodland in the Neotropics. The species in this family were formerly spread over the families Tyrannidae, Pipridae, and Cotingidae. They are small to medium-sized birds. They do not have the sophisticated vocal capabilities of the songbirds. Most, but not all, have plain coloring.

- Northern schiffornis, Schiffornis veraepacis
- Speckled mourner, Laniocera rufescens
- Masked tityra, Tityra semifasciata
- Black-crowned tityra, Tityra inquisitor
- Barred becard, Pachyramphus versicolor
- Cinnamon becard, Pachyramphus cinnamomeus
- White-winged becard, Pachyramphus polychopterus
- Black-and-white becard, Pachyramphus albogriseus
- Rose-throated becard, Pachyramphus aglaiae

== Royal flycatcher and allies ==
Order: Passeriformes Family: Onychorhynchidae

The members of this small family, created in 2018, were formerly considered to be tyrant flycatchers, family Tyrannidae.

- Sharpbill, Oxyruncus cristatus
- Tropical royal flycatcher, Onychorhynchus coronatus
- Ruddy-tailed flycatcher, Terenotriccus erythrurus
- Sulphur-rumped flycatcher, Myiobius sulphureipygius
- Black-tailed flycatcher, Myiobius atricaudus

== Tyrant flycatchers ==
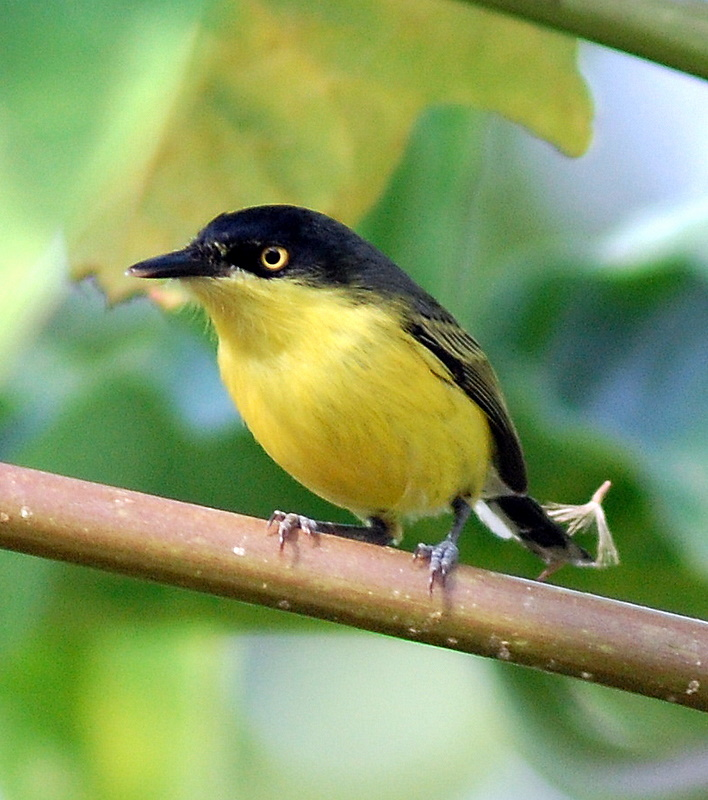
Common tody-flycatcher

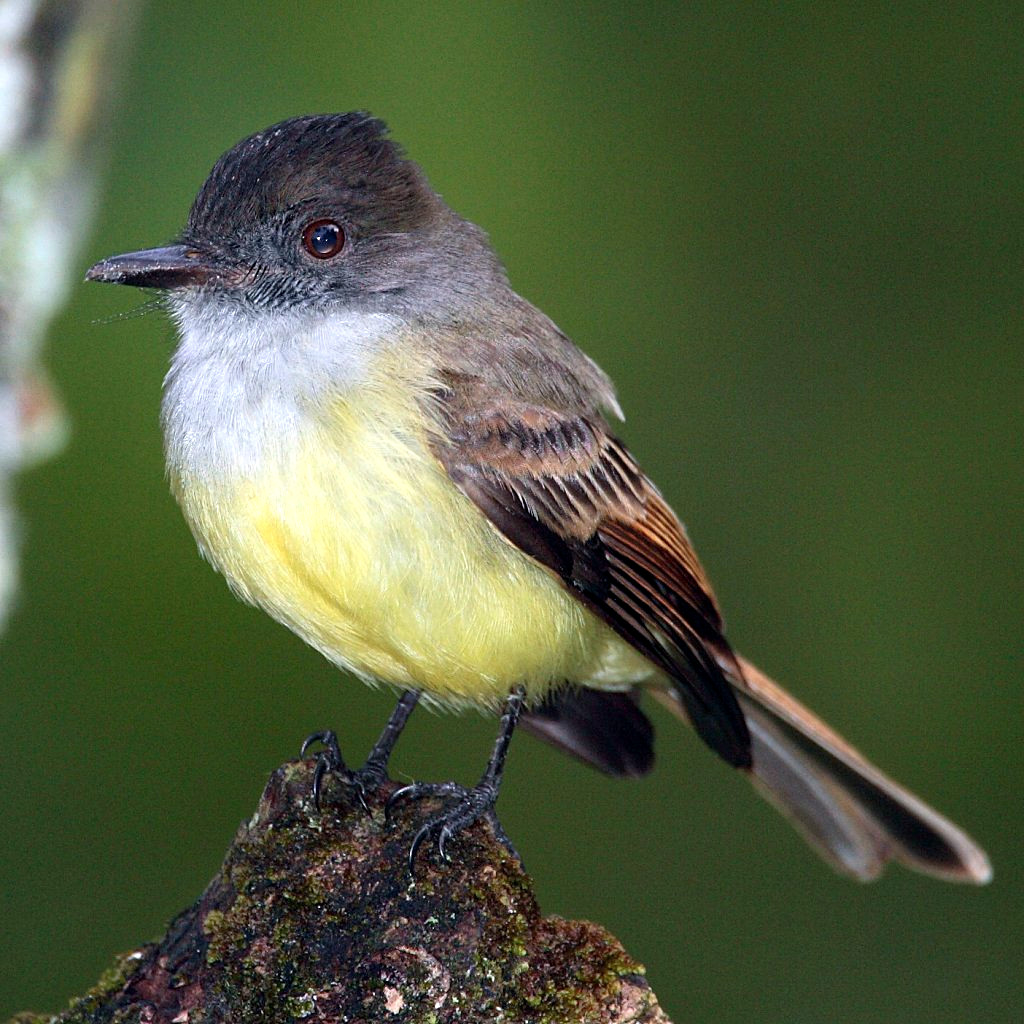
Dusky-capped flycatcher

Order: Passeriformes Family: Tyrannidae

Tyrant flycatchers are passerine birds which occur throughout North and South America. They superficially resemble the Old World flycatchers, but are more robust and have stronger bills. They do not have the sophisticated vocal capabilities of the songbirds. Most, but not all, have plain coloring. As the name implies, most are insectivorous.

- Gray-headed piprites, Piprites griseiceps
- Stub-tailed spadebill, Platyrinchus cancrominus
- White-throated spadebill, Platyrinchus mystaceus
- Golden-crowned spadebill, Platyrinchus coronatus
- Olive-striped flycatcher, Mionectes olivaceus
- Ochre-bellied flycatcher, Mionectes oleagineus
- Sepia-capped flycatcher, Leptopogon amaurocephalus
- Slaty-capped flycatcher, Leptopogon superciliaris
- Rufous-browed tyrannulet, Phylloscartes superciliaris
- Black-capped pygmy-tyrant, Myiornis atricapillus
- Scale-crested pygmy-tyrant, Lophotriccus pileatus
- Northern bentbill, Oncostoma cinereigulare
- Slate-headed tody-flycatcher, Poecilotriccus sylvia
- Common tody-flycatcher, Todirostrum cinereum
- Black-headed tody-flycatcher, Todirostrum nigriceps
- Eye-ringed flatbill, Rhynchocyclus brevirostris
- Yellow-olive flycatcher, Tolmomyias sulphurescens
- Yellow-margined flycatcher, Tolmomyias assimilis
- Yellow-bellied tyrannulet, Ornithion semiflavum
- Brown-capped tyrannulet, Ornithion brunneicapillus
- Northern beardless-tyrannulet, Camptostoma imberbe
- Southern beardless-tyrannulet, Camptostoma obsoletum
- Cocos flycatcher, Nesotriccus ridgwayi (E) (vulnerable)
- Mouse-colored tyrannulet, Nesotriccus murinus
- Yellow tyrannulet, Capsiempis flaveola
- Yellow-crowned tyrannulet, Tyrannulus elatus
- Greenish elaenia, Myiopagis viridicata
- Yellow-bellied elaenia, Elaenia flavogaster
- Lesser elaenia, Elaenia chiriquensis
- Mountain elaenia, Elaenia frantzii
- Torrent tyrannulet, Serpophaga cinerea
- Rough-legged tyrannulet, Phyllomyias burmeisteri
- Mistletoe tyrannulet, Zimmerius parvus
- Bright-rumped attila, Attila spadiceus
- Rufous mourner, Rhytipterna holerythra
- Dusky-capped flycatcher, Myiarchus tuberculifer
- Panama flycatcher, Myiarchus panamensis
- Ash-throated flycatcher, Myiarchus cinerascens (A)
- Nutting's flycatcher, Myiarchus nuttingi
- Great crested flycatcher, Myiarchus crinitus
- Brown-crested flycatcher, Myiarchus tyrannulus
- Lesser kiskadee, Philohydor lictor (A)
- Great kiskadee, Pitangus sulphuratus
- Boat-billed flycatcher, Megarynchus pitangua
- Rusty-margined flycatcher, Myiozetetes cayanensis
- Social flycatcher, Myiozetetes similis
- Gray-capped flycatcher, Myiozetetes granadensis
- White-ringed flycatcher, Conopias albovittatus
- Golden-bellied flycatcher, Myiodynastes hemichrysus (E-R)
- Golden-crowned flycatcher, Myiodynastes chrysocephalus (A)
- Streaked flycatcher, Myiodynastes maculatus
- Sulphur-bellied flycatcher, Myiodynastes luteiventris
- Piratic flycatcher, Legatus leucophaius
- Tropical kingbird, Tyrannus melancholicus
- Couch's kingbird, Tyrannus couchii (A)
- Western kingbird, Tyrannus verticalis
- Eastern kingbird, Tyrannus tyrannus
- Gray kingbird, Tyrannus dominicensis
- Scissor-tailed flycatcher, Tyrannus forficatus
- Fork-tailed flycatcher, Tyrannus savana
- Bran-colored flycatcher, Myiophobus fasciatus
- Tawny-chested flycatcher, Aphanotriccus capitalis (vulnerable)
- Tufted flycatcher, Mitrephanes phaeocercus
- Olive-sided flycatcher, Contopus cooperi
- Dark pewee, Contopus lugubris (E-R)
- Ochraceous pewee, Contopus ochraceus (E-R)
- Western wood-pewee, Contopus sordidulus (R?)
- Eastern wood-pewee, Contopus virens
- Tropical pewee, Contopus cinereus
- Yellow-bellied flycatcher, Empidonax flaviventris
- Acadian flycatcher, Empidonax virescens
- Alder flycatcher, Empidonax alnorum
- Willow flycatcher, Empidonax traillii
- White-throated flycatcher, Empidonax albigularis
- Least flycatcher, Empidonax minimus
- Yellowish flycatcher, Empidonax flavescens
- Black-capped flycatcher, Empidonax atriceps (E-R)
- Black phoebe, Sayornis nigricans
- Eastern phoebe, Sayornis phoebe (A)
- Vermilion flycatcher, Pyrocephalus rubinus (A)
- Northern scrub-flycatcher, Sublegatus arenarum
- Long-tailed tyrant, Colonia colonus

== Gnateaters ==
Order: Passeriformes Family: Conopophagidae

The members of this small family are found across northern South America and into Central America. They are forest birds, usually seen on the ground or in the low understory.

- Black-crowned antpitta, Pittasoma michleri

== Typical antbirds ==
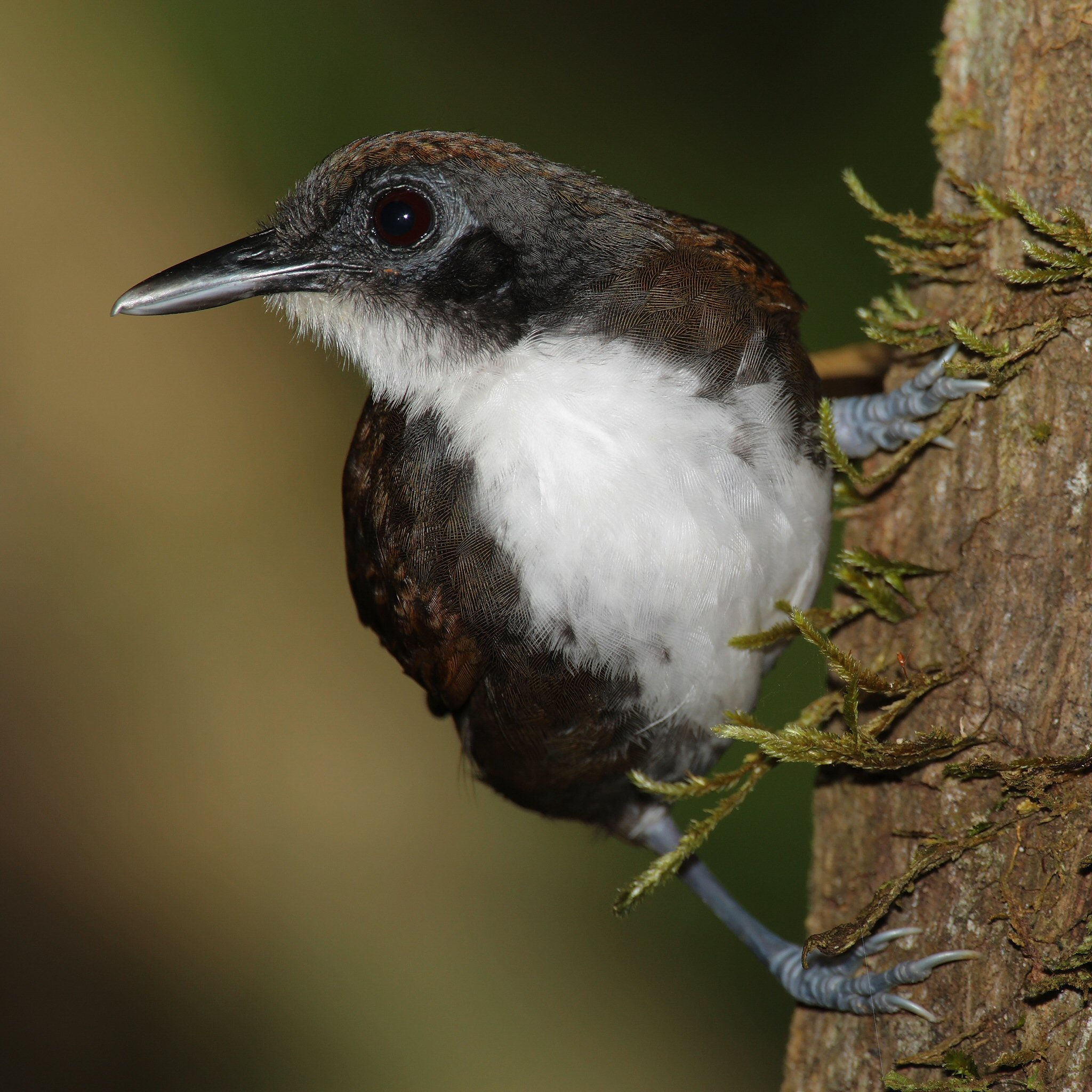
Bicolored antbird

Order: Passeriformes Family: Thamnophilidae

The antbirds are a large family of small passerine birds of subtropical and tropical Central and South America. They are forest birds which tend to feed on insects at or near the ground. A sizable minority of them specialize in following columns of army ants to eat small invertebrates that leave their hiding places to flee from the ants. Many species lack bright color, with brown, black, and white being the dominant tones.

- Fasciated antshrike, Cymbilaimus lineatus
- Great antshrike, Taraba major
- Barred antshrike, Thamnophilus doliatus
- Black-hooded antshrike, Thamnophilus bridgesi (E-R)
- Black-crowned antshrike, Thamnophilus atrinucha
- Russet antshrike, Thamnistes anabatinus
- Plain antvireo, Dysithamnus mentalis
- Streak-crowned antvireo, Dysithamnus striaticeps
- Spot-crowned antvireo, Dysithamnus puncticeps
- White-flanked antwren, Myrmotherula axillaris
- Slaty antwren, Myrmotherula schisticolor
- Checker-throated stipplethroat, Epinecrophylla fulviventris
- Dot-winged antwren, Microrhopias quixensis
- Rufous-rumped antwren, Euchrepomis callinota
- Dusky antbird, Cercomacroides tyrannina
- Bare-crowned antbird, Gymnocichla nudiceps
- Zeledon's antbird, Hafferia zeledoni
- Chestnut-backed antbird, Poliocrania exsul
- Dull-mantled antbird, Sipia laemosticta
- Spotted antbird, Hylophylax naevioides
- Bicolored antbird, Gymnopithys bicolor
- Ocellated antbird, Phaenostictus mcleannani

== Antpittas ==
Order: Passeriformes Family: Grallariidae

Antpittas resemble the true pittas with strong, longish legs, very short tails, and stout bills.

- Scaled antpitta, Grallaria guatimalensis
- Streak-chested antpitta, Hylopezus perspicillatus
- Thicket antpitta, Hylopezus dives
- Ochre-breasted antpitta, Grallaricula flavirostris

== Tapaculos ==
Order: Passeriformes Family: Rhinocryptidae

The tapaculos are small suboscine passeriform birds with numerous species in South and Central America. They are terrestrial species that fly only poorly on their short wings. They have strong legs, well-suited to their habitat of grassland or forest undergrowth. The tail is cocked and pointed towards the head.

- Silvery-fronted tapaculo, Scytalopus argentifrons (E-R)

== Antthrushes ==
Order: Passeriformes Family: Formicariidae

Antthrushes resemble small rails with strong, longish legs, very short tails, and stout bills.

- Black-faced antthrush, Formicarius analis
- Black-headed antthrush, Formicarius nigricapillus
- Rufous-breasted antthrush, Formicarius rufipectus

== Ovenbirds and woodcreepers ==
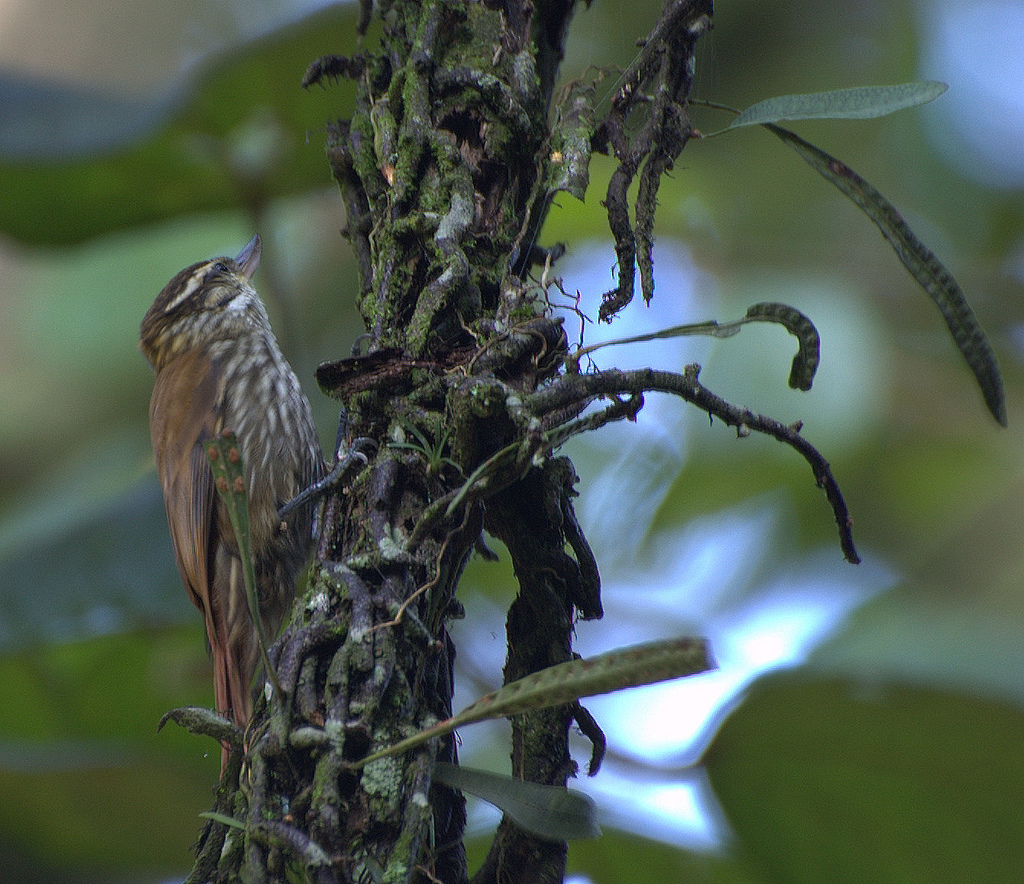
Streaked xenops

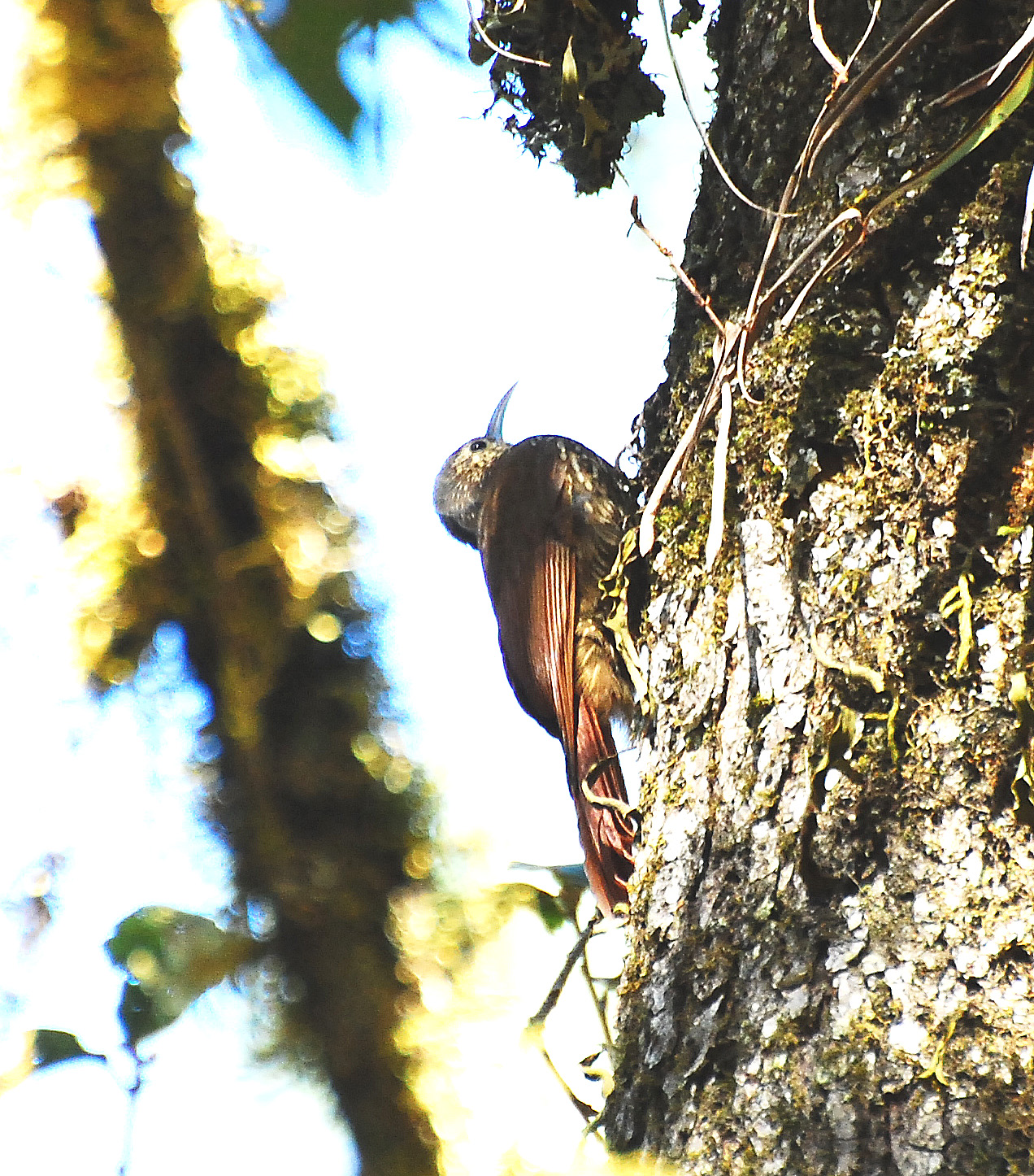
Spot-crowned woodcreeper

Order: Passeriformes Family: Furnariidae

Ovenbirds comprise a large family of small sub-oscine passerine bird species found in Central and South America. They are a diverse group of insectivores which gets its name from the elaborate "oven-like" clay nests built by some species, although others build stick nests or nest in tunnels or clefts in rock. The woodcreepers are brownish birds which maintain an upright vertical posture supported by their stiff tail vanes. They feed mainly on insects taken from tree trunks.

- Middle American leaftosser, Sclerurus mexicanus
- Gray-throated leaftosser, Sclerurus albigularis
- Scaly-throated leaftosser, Sclerurus guatemalensis
- Olivaceous woodcreeper, Sittasomus griseicapillus
- Long-tailed woodcreeper, Deconychura longicauda
- Ruddy woodcreeper, Dendrocincla homochroa
- Tawny-winged woodcreeper, Dendrocincla anabatina
- Plain-brown woodcreeper, Dendrocincla fuliginosa
- Wedge-billed woodcreeper, Glyphorynchus spirurus
- Northern barred-woodcreeper, Dendrocolaptes sanctithomae
- Black-banded woodcreeper, Dendrocolaptes picumnus
- Strong-billed woodcreeper, Xiphocolaptes promeropirhynchus
- Cocoa woodcreeper, Xiphorhynchus susurrans
- Ivory-billed woodcreeper, Xiphorhynchus flavigaster
- Black-striped woodcreeper, Xiphorhynchus lachrymosus
- Spotted woodcreeper, Xiphorhynchus erythropygius
- Brown-billed scythebill, Campylorhamphus pusillus
- Streak-headed woodcreeper, Lepidocolaptes souleyetii
- Spot-crowned woodcreeper, Lepidocolaptes affinis
- Plain xenops, Xenops minutus
- Streaked xenops, Xenops rutilans
- Buffy tuftedcheek, Pseudocolaptes lawrencii
- Buff-fronted foliage-gleaner, Dendroma rufa
- Scaly-throated foliage-gleaner, Anabacerthia variegaticeps
- Lineated foliage-gleaner, Syndactyla subalaris
- Ruddy foliage-gleaner, Clibanornis rubiginosus
- Streak-breasted treehunter, Thripadectes rufobrunneus (E-R)
- Buff-throated foliage-gleaner, Automolus ochrolaemus
- Chiriqui foliage-gleaner, Automolus exsertus (E-R)
- Striped woodhaunter, Automolus subulatus
- Spotted barbtail, Premnoplex brunnescens
- Ruddy treerunner, Margarornis rubiginosus (E-R)
- Red-faced spinetail, Cranioleuca erythrops
- Pale-breasted spinetail, Synallaxis albescens
- Slaty spinetail, Synallaxis brachyura

== Vireos, shrike-babblers, and erpornis ==
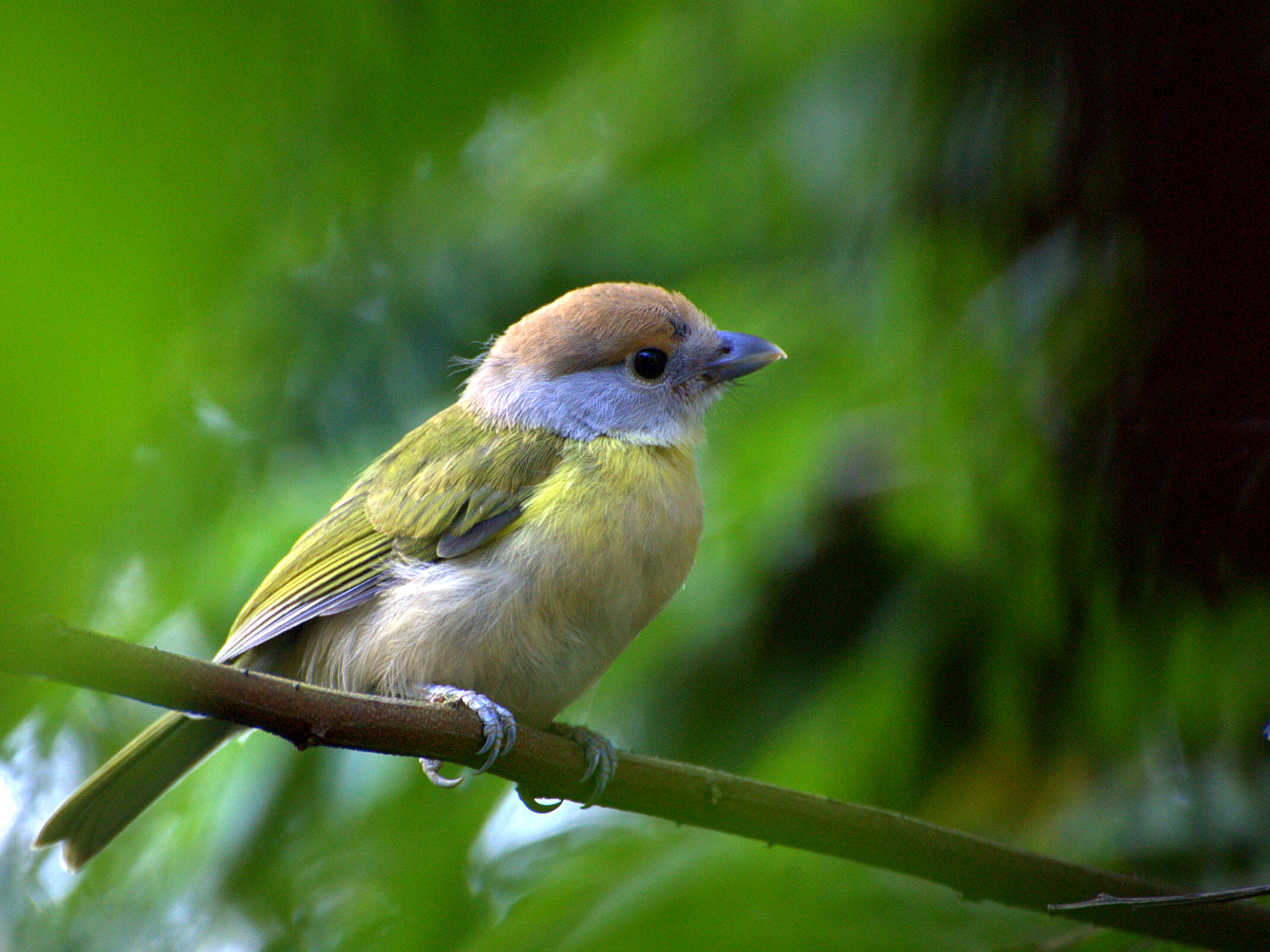
Rufous-browed peppershrike

Order: Passeriformes Family: Vireonidae

The vireos are a group of small to medium-sized passerine birds. They are typically greenish in color and resemble wood warblers apart from their heavier bills.

- Rufous-browed peppershrike, Cyclarhis gujanensis
- Scrub greenlet, Hylophilus flavipes
- Green shrike-vireo, Vireolanius pulchellus
- Tawny-crowned greenlet, Tunchiornis ochraceiceps
- Lesser greenlet, Pachysylvia decurtata
- White-eyed vireo, Vireo griseus
- Mangrove vireo, Vireo pallens
- Yellow-throated vireo, Vireo flavifrons
- Yellow-winged vireo, Vireo carmioli (E-R)
- Blue-headed vireo, Vireo solitarius
- Philadelphia vireo, Vireo philadelphicus
- Warbling vireo, Vireo gilvus
- Brown-capped vireo, Vireo leucophrys
- Red-eyed vireo, Vireo olivaceus
- Yellow-green vireo, Vireo flavoviridis
- Black-whiskered vireo, Vireo altiloquus

== Crows, jays, and magpies ==
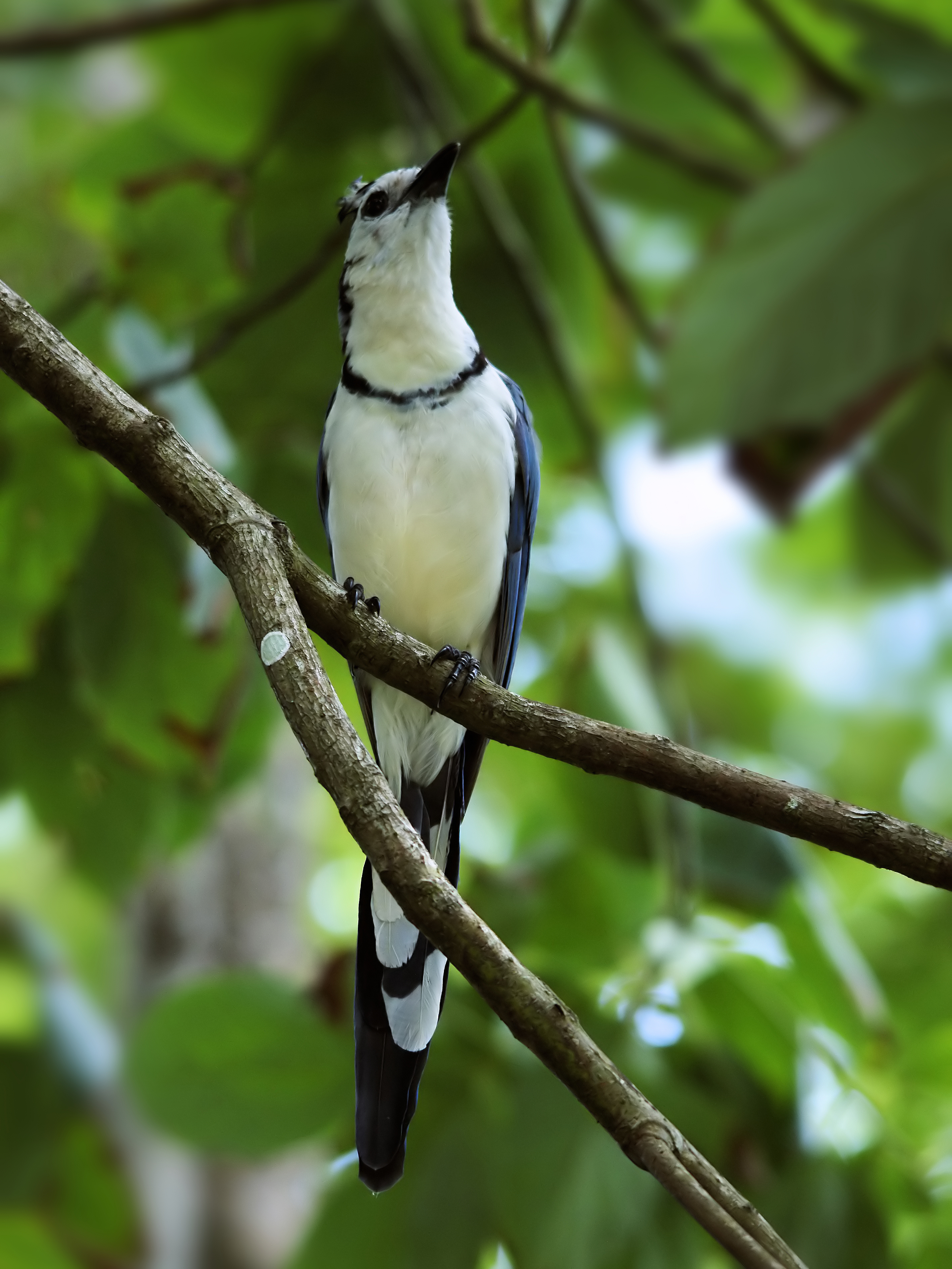
White-throated magpie-jay

Order: Passeriformes Family: Corvidae

The family Corvidae includes crows, ravens, jays, choughs, magpies, treepies, nutcrackers, and ground jays. Corvids are above average in size among the Passeriformes, and some of the larger species show high levels of intelligence.

- Silvery-throated jay, Cyanolyca argentigula (E-R)
- Azure-hooded jay, Cyanolyca cucullata
- White-throated magpie-jay, Calocitta formosa
- Brown jay, Psilorhinus morio
- Black-chested jay, Cyanocorax affinis

== Swallows ==
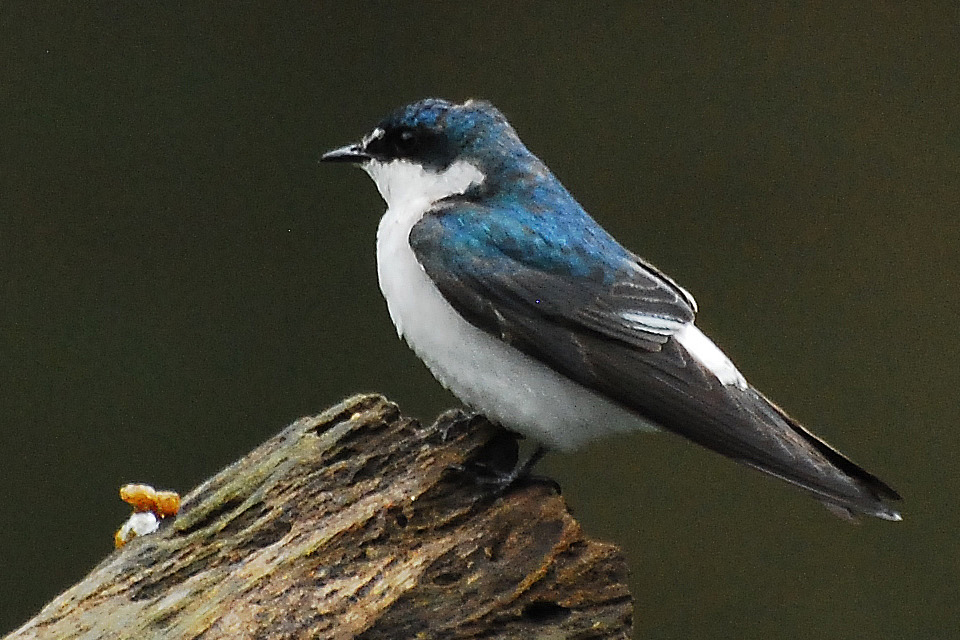
Mangrove swallow

Order: Passeriformes Family: Hirundinidae

The family Hirundinidae is adapted to aerial feeding. They have a slender streamlined body, long pointed wings, and a short bill with a wide gape. The feet are adapted to perching rather than walking, and the front toes are partially joined at the base.

- Bank swallow, Riparia riparia
- Tree swallow, Tachycineta bicolor
- Violet-green swallow, Tachycineta thalassina
- Mangrove swallow, Tachycineta albilinea
- Blue-and-white swallow, Pygochelidon cyanoleuca
- Northern rough-winged swallow, Stelgidopteryx serripennis
- Southern rough-winged swallow, Stelgidopteryx ruficollis
- Brown-chested martin, Progne tapera
- Purple martin, Progne subis
- Sinaloa martin, Progne sinaloae (A)
- Gray-breasted martin, Progne chalybea
- Southern martin, Progne elegans (A)
- Barn swallow, Hirundo rustica
- Cliff swallow, Petrochelidon pyrrhonota
- Cave swallow, Petrochelidon fulva (A)

== Waxwings ==
Order: Passeriformes Family: Bombycillidae

The waxwings are a group of birds with soft silky plumage and unique red tips to some of the wing feathers. In the Bohemian and cedar waxwings, these tips look like sealing wax and give the group its name. These are arboreal birds of northern forests. They live on insects in summer and berries in winter.

- Cedar waxwing, Bombycilla cedrorum

== Silky-flycatchers ==
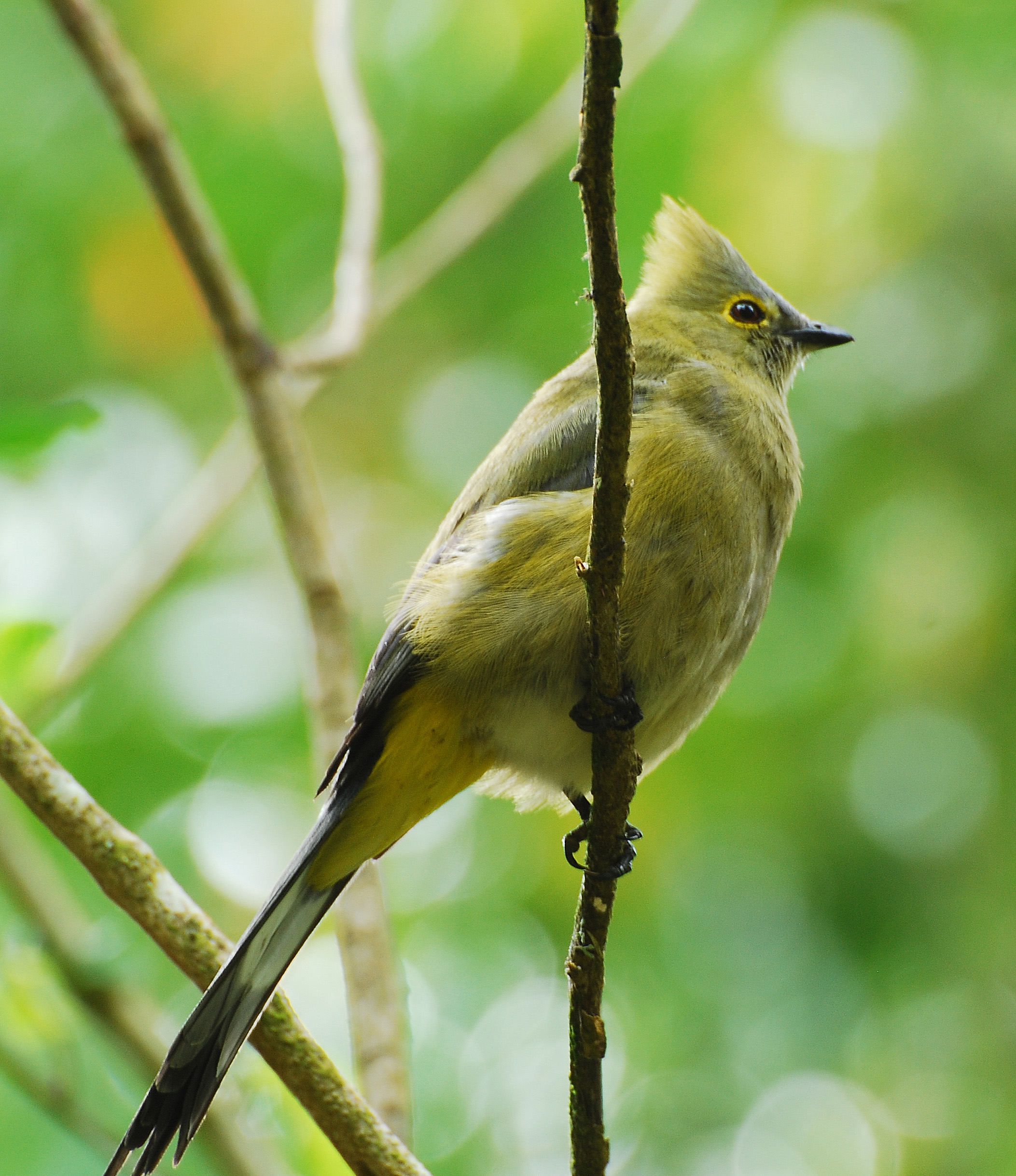
Long-tailed silky-flycatcher

Order: Passeriformes Family: Ptiliogonatidae

The silky-flycatchers are a small family of passerine birds which occur mainly in Central America, although the range of one species extends to central California. They are related to waxwings and like that group have soft silky plumage, usually gray or pale yellow. They have small crests.

- Black-and-yellow silky-flycatcher, Phainoptila melanoxantha (E-R)
- Long-tailed silky-flycatcher, Ptiliogonys caudatus (E-R)

== Gnatcatchers ==
Order: Passeriformes Family: Polioptilidae

These dainty birds resemble Old World warblers in their build and habits, moving restlessly through the foliage seeking insects. The gnatcatchers and gnatwrens are mainly soft bluish gray in color and have the typical insectivore's long sharp bill. They are birds of fairly open woodland or scrub, which nest in bushes or trees.

- Trilling gnatwren, Ramphocaenus melanurus
- Tawny-faced gnatwren, Microbates cinereiventris
- White-browed gnatcatcher, Polioptila bilineata
- White-lored gnatcatcher, Polioptila albiloris

== Wrens ==
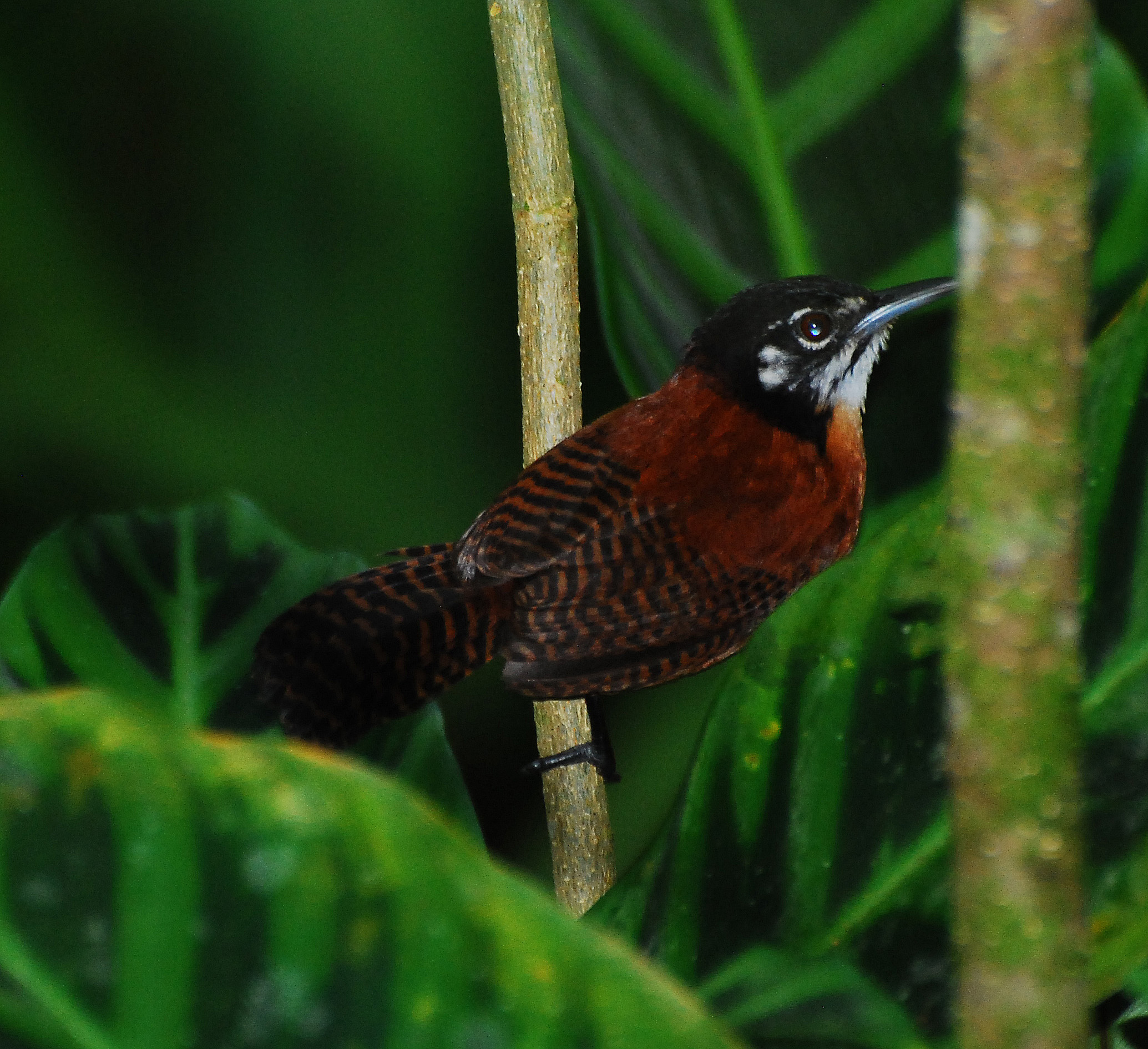
Bay wren

Order: Passeriformes Family: Troglodytidae

The wrens are mainly small and inconspicuous except for their loud songs. These birds have short wings and thin down-turned bills. Several species often hold their tails upright. All are insectivorous.

- Rock wren, Salpinctes obsoletus
- Nightingale wren, Microcerculus philomela
- Scaly-breasted wren, Microcerculus marginatus
- House wren, Troglodytes aedon
- Ochraceous wren, Troglodytes ochraceus (E-R)
- Timberline wren, Thryorchilus browni (E-R)
- Grass wren, Cistothorus platensis
- Band-backed wren, Campylorhynchus zonatus
- Rufous-backed wren, Campylorhynchus capistratus
- Black-throated wren, Pheugopedius atrogularis
- Rufous-breasted wren, Pheugopedius rutilus
- Spot-breasted wren, Pheugopedius maculipectus
- Black-bellied wren, Pheugopedius fasciatoventris
- Rufous-and-white wren, Thryophilus rufalbus
- Banded wren, Thryophilus pleurostictus
- Stripe-breasted wren, Cantorchilus thoracicus
- Cabanis's wren, Cantorchilus modestus
- Canebrake wren, Cantorchilus zeledoni
- Isthmian wren, Cantorchilus elutus (E-R)
- Bay wren, Cantorchilus nigricapillus
- Riverside wren, Cantorchilus semibadius (E-R)
- White-breasted wood-wren, Henicorhina leucosticta
- Gray-breasted wood-wren, Henicorhina leucophrys
- Song wren, Cyphorhinus phaeocephalus

== Mockingbirds and thrashers ==
Order: Passeriformes Family: Mimidae

The mimids are a family of passerine birds that includes thrashers, mockingbirds, tremblers, and the New World catbirds. These birds are notable for their vocalizations, especially their ability to mimic a wide variety of birds and other sounds heard outdoors. Their coloring tends towards dull-grays and browns.

- Gray catbird, Dumetella carolinensis
- Tropical mockingbird, Mimus gilvus
- Northern mockingbird, Mimus polyglottos (A)

== Dippers ==
Order: Passeriformes Family: Cinclidae

Dippers are a group of perching birds whose habitat includes aquatic environments in the Americas, Europe, and Asia. They are named for their bobbing or dipping movements.

- American dipper, Cinclus mexicanus

== Thrushes and allies ==
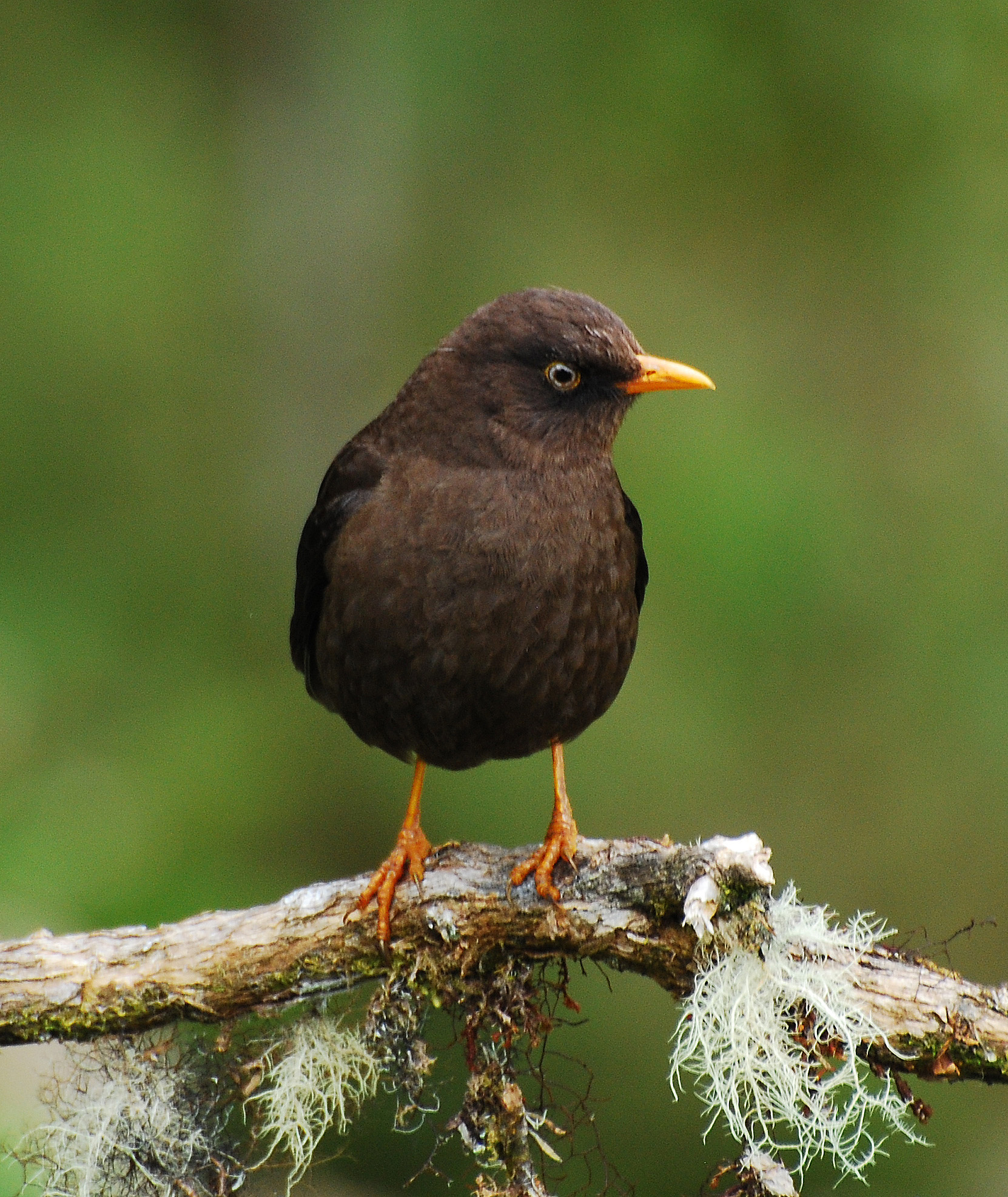
Sooty robin

Order: Passeriformes Family: Turdidae

The thrushes are a group of passerine birds that occur mainly in the Old World. They are plump, soft plumaged, small to medium-sized insectivores or sometimes omnivores, often feeding on the ground. Many have attractive songs.

- Black-faced solitaire, Myadestes melanops (E-R)
- Black-billed nightingale-thrush, Catharus gracilirostris (E-R)
- Orange-billed nightingale-thrush, Catharus aurantiirostris
- Slaty-backed nightingale-thrush, Catharus fuscater
- Ruddy-capped nightingale-thrush, Catharus frantzii
- Black-headed nightingale-thrush, Catharus mexicanus
- Veery, Catharus fuscescens
- Gray-cheeked thrush, Catharus minimus
- Swainson's thrush, Catharus ustulatus
- Wood thrush, Hylocichla mustelina
- Sooty thrush, Turdus nigrescens (E-R)
- Mountain thrush, Turdus plebejus
- Pale-vented thrush, Turdus obsoletus
- Clay-colored thrush, Turdus grayi
- White-throated thrush, Turdus assimilis

== Waxbills and allies ==
Order: Passeriformes Family: Estrildidae

The estrildid finches are small passerine birds of the Old World tropics and Australasia. They are gregarious and often colonial seed eaters with short thick but pointed bills. They are all similar in structure and habits, but have wide variation in plumage colors and patterns.

- Tricolored munia, Lonchura malacca (I)

== Old World sparrows ==
Order: Passeriformes Family: Passeridae

Sparrows are small passerine birds. In general, sparrows tend to be small, plump, brown or gray birds with short tails and short powerful beaks. Sparrows are seed eaters, but they also consume small insects.

- House sparrow, Passer domesticus (I)

== Wagtails and pipits ==
Order: Passeriformes Family: Motacillidae

Motacillidae is a family of small passerine birds with medium to long tails. They include the wagtails, longclaws, and pipits. They are slender ground-feeding insectivores of open country.

- American pipit, Anthus rubescens (A)

== Finches, euphonias, and allies ==
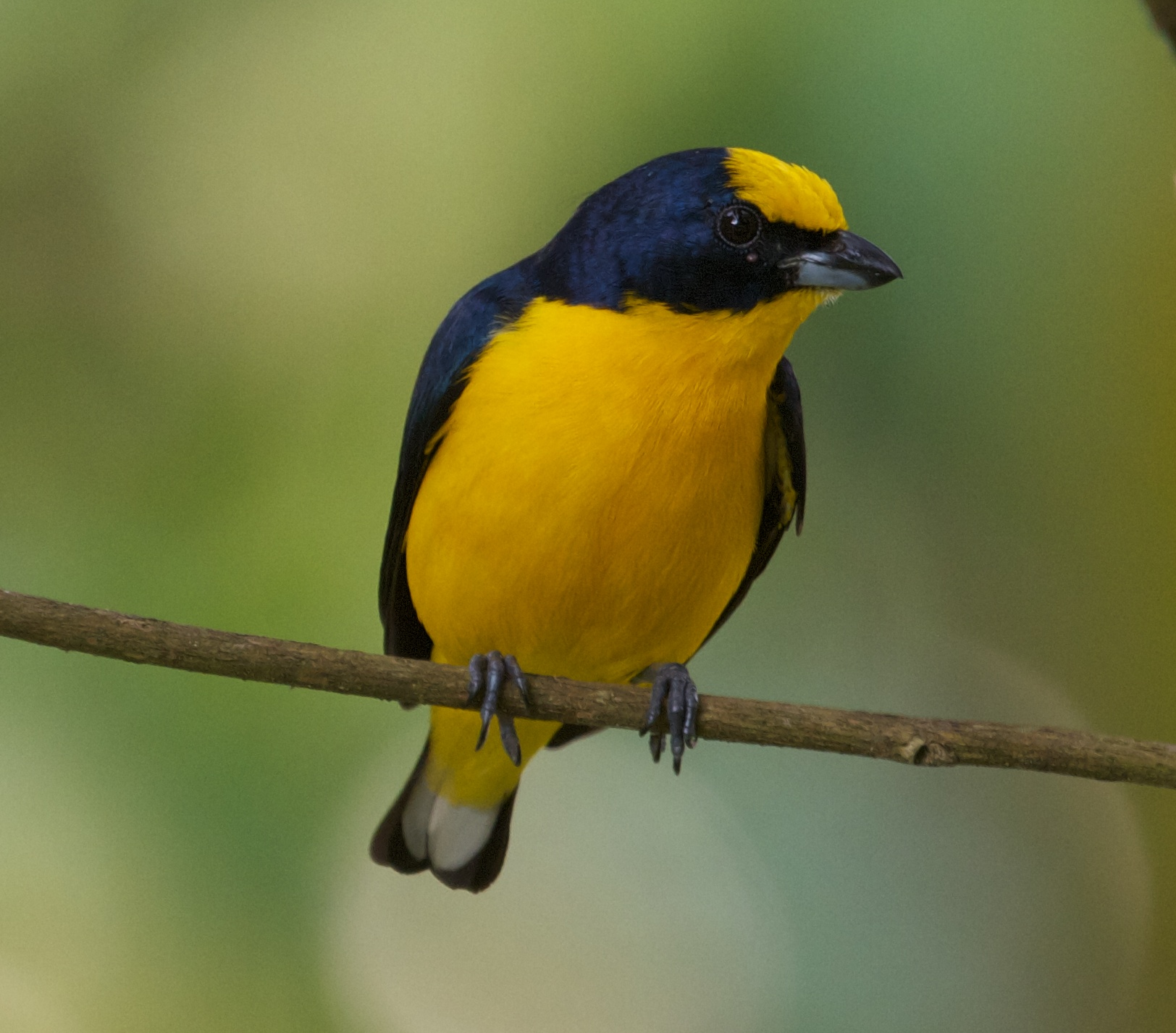
Thick-billed euphonia

Order: Passeriformes Family: Fringillidae

Finches are seed-eating passerine birds, that are small to moderately large and have a strong beak, usually conical and in some species very large. All have twelve tail feathers and nine primaries. These birds have a bouncing flight with alternating bouts of flapping and gliding on closed wings, and most sing well.

- Elegant euphonia, Chlorophonia elegantissima
- Golden-browed chlorophonia, Chlorophonia callophrys (E-R)
- Scrub euphonia, Euphonia affinis
- Yellow-crowned euphonia, Euphonia luteicapilla
- White-vented euphonia, Euphonia minuta
- Yellow-throated euphonia, Euphonia hirundinacea
- Thick-billed euphonia, Euphonia laniirostris
- Spot-crowned euphonia, Euphonia imitans (E-R)
- Olive-backed euphonia, Euphonia gouldi
- Tawny-capped euphonia, Euphonia anneae
- Yellow-bellied siskin, Spinus xanthogastra
- Lesser goldfinch, Spinus psaltria

== Thrush-tanager ==
Order: Passeriformes Family: Rhodinocichlidae

This species was historically placed in family Thraupidae. It was placed in its own family in 2017.

- Rosy thrush-tanager, Rhodinocichla rosea

== New World sparrows ==
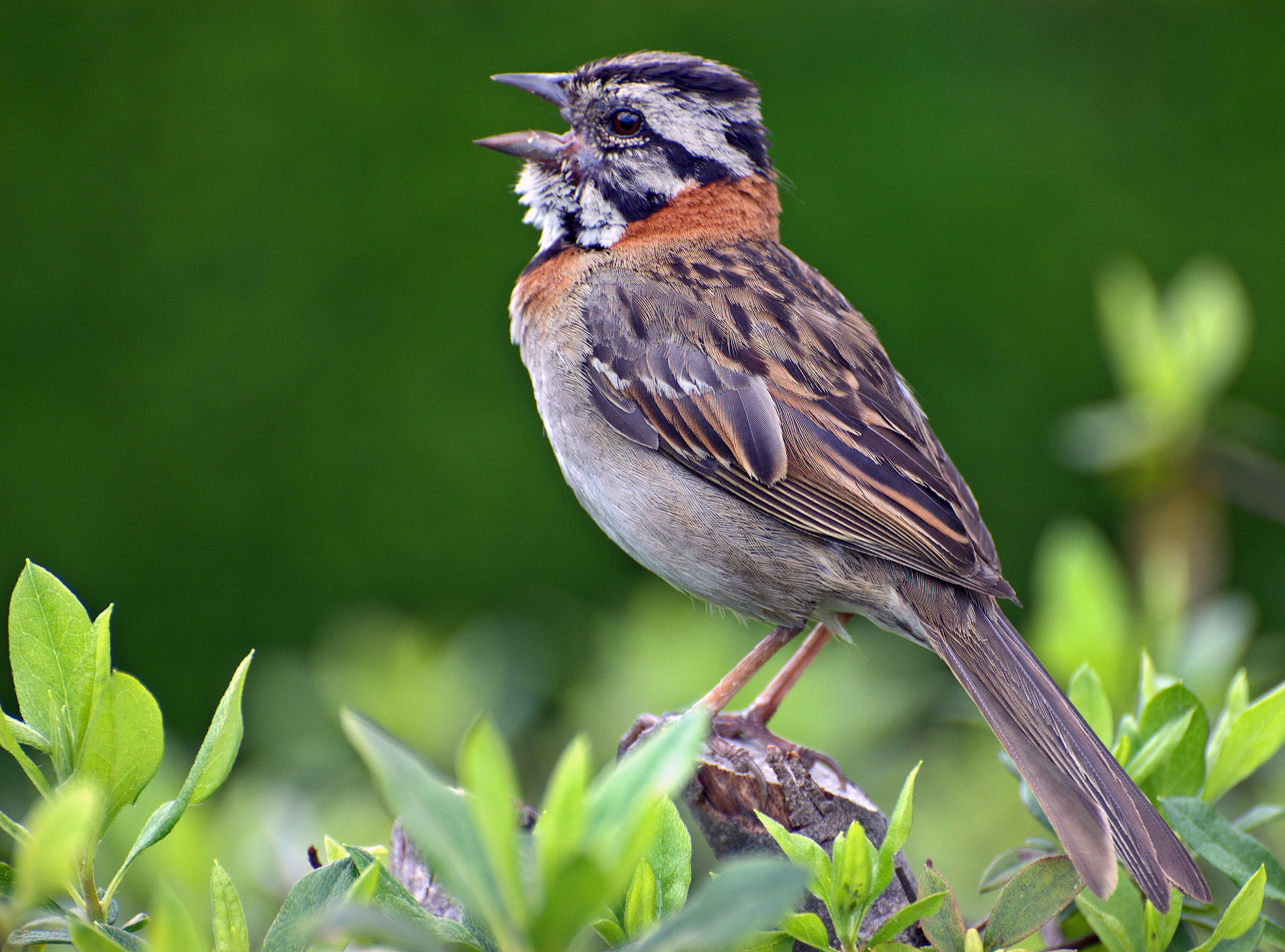
Rufous-collared sparrow

Order: Passeriformes Family: Passerellidae

Until 2017, these species were considered part of the family Emberizidae. Most of the species are known as sparrows, but these birds are not closely related to the Old World sparrows which are in the family Passeridae. Many of these have distinctive head patterns.

- Ashy-throated chlorospingus, Chlorospingus canigularis
- Sooty-capped chlorospingus, Chlorospingus pileatus (E-R)
- Common chlorospingus, Chlorospingus flavopectus
- Stripe-headed sparrow, Peucaea ruficauda
- Botteri's sparrow, Peucaea botterii
- Grasshopper sparrow, Ammodramus savannarum
- Olive sparrow, Arremonops rufivirgatus
- Black-striped sparrow, Arremonops conirostris
- Lark sparrow, Chondestes grammacus
- Chipping sparrow, Spizella passerina (A)
- Clay-colored sparrow, Spizella pallida (A)
- Costa Rican brushfinch, Arremon costaricensis (E-R)
- Orange-billed sparrow, Arremon aurantiirostris
- Chestnut-capped brushfinch, Arremon brunneinucha
- Sooty-faced finch, Arremon crassirostris (E-R)
- Volcano junco, Junco vulcani (E-R)
- Rufous-collared sparrow, Zonotrichia capensis
- White-crowned sparrow, Zonotrichia leucophrys (A)
- Savannah sparrow, Passerculus sandwichensis (A)
- Lincoln's sparrow, Melospiza lincolnii
- Large-footed finch, Pezopetes capitalis (E-R)
- White-eared ground-sparrow, Melozone leucotis
- Cabanis's ground-sparrow, Melozone cabanisi (E)
- Rusty sparrow, Aimophila rufescens
- White-naped brushfinch, Atlapetes albinucha
- Yellow-thighed brushfinch, Atlapetes tibialis (E-R)

== Wrenthrush ==
Order: Passeriformes Family: Zeledoniidae

Despite its name, this species is neither a wren nor a thrush, and is not closely related to either family. It was moved from the New World warblers (Parulidae) and placed in its own family in 2017.

- Wrenthrush, Zeledonia coronata (E-R)

== Yellow-breasted chat ==
Order: Passeriformes Family: Icteriidae

This species was historically placed in the New World warblers but nonetheless most authorities were unsure if it belonged there. It was placed in its own family in 2017.

- Yellow-breasted chat, Icteria virens

== Troupials and allies ==
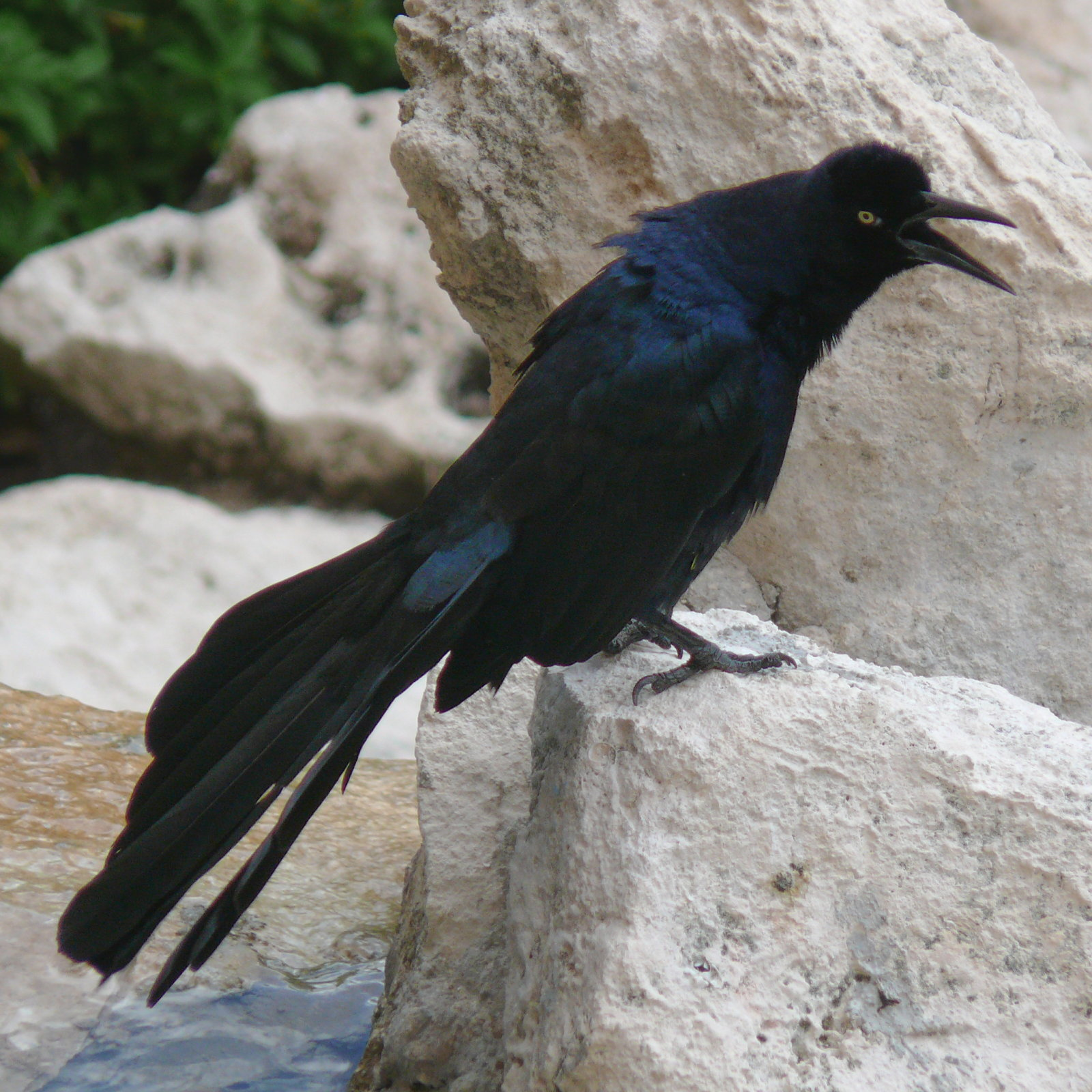
Great-tailed grackle

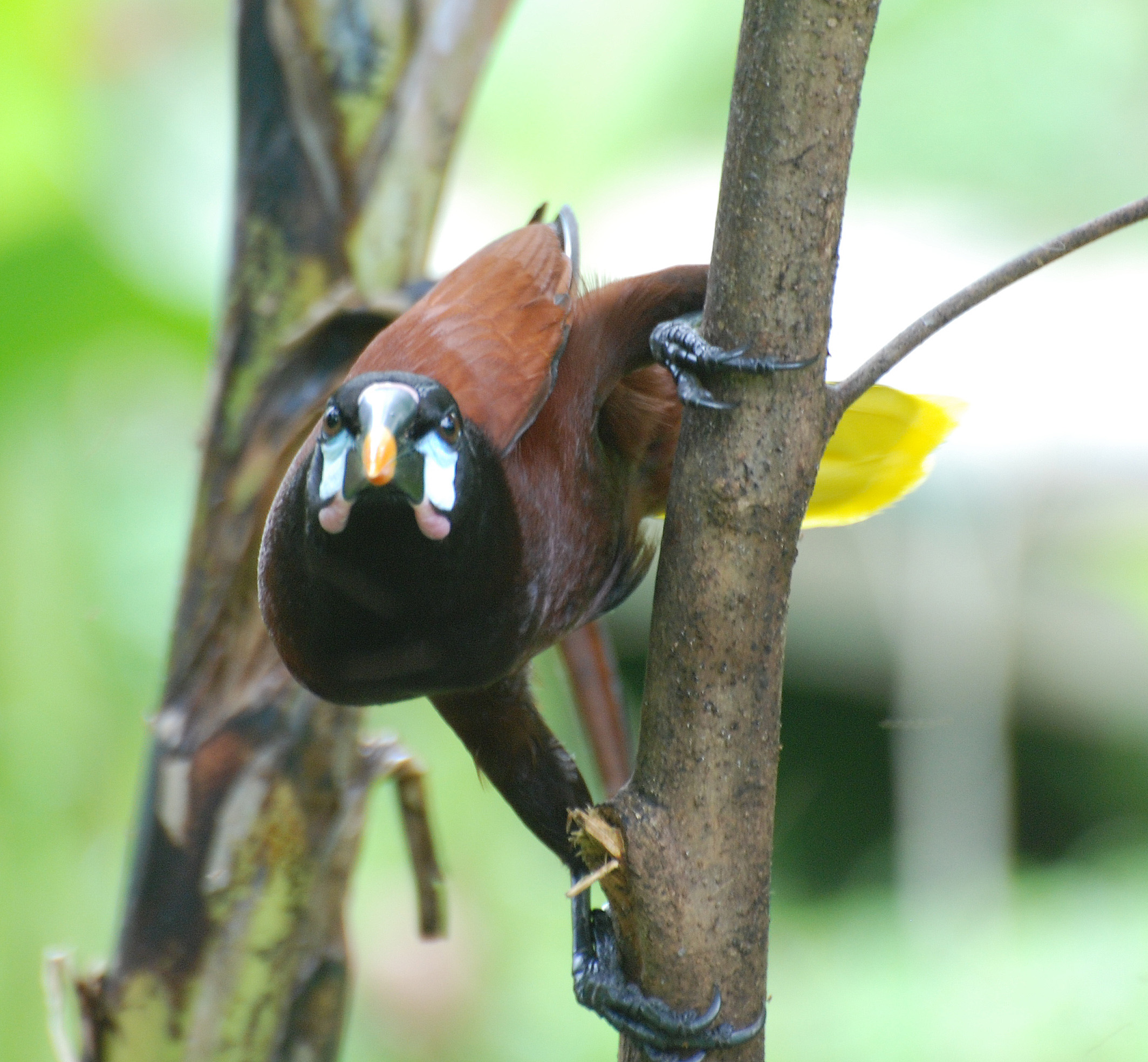
Montezuma oropendola

Order: Passeriformes Family: Icteridae

The icterids are a group of small to medium-sized, often colorful, passerine birds restricted to the New World and include the grackles, New World blackbirds, and New World orioles. Most species have black as the predominant plumage color, often enlivened by yellow, orange, or red.

- Yellow-headed blackbird, Xanthocephalus xanthocephalus (A)
- Bobolink, Dolichonyx oryzivorus
- Eastern meadowlark, Sturnella magna
- Red-breasted meadowlark, Leistes militaris
- Yellow-billed cacique, Amblycercus holosericeus
- Crested oropendola, Psarocolius decumanus
- Chestnut-headed oropendola, Psarocolius wagleri
- Montezuma oropendola, Psarocolius montezuma
- Scarlet-rumped cacique, Cacicus uropygialis
- Black-cowled oriole, Icterus prosthemelas
- Orchard oriole, Icterus spurius
- Yellow-backed oriole, Icterus chrysater (A)
- Yellow-tailed oriole, Icterus mesomelas
- Streak-backed oriole, Icterus pustulatus
- Bullock's oriole, Icterus bullockii (A)
- Spot-breasted oriole, Icterus pectoralis
- Baltimore oriole, Icterus galbula
- Red-winged blackbird, Agelaius phoeniceus
- Shiny cowbird, Molothrus bonariensis
- Bronzed cowbird, Molothrus aeneus
- Giant cowbird, Molothrus oryzivorus
- Melodious blackbird, Dives dives
- Great-tailed grackle, Quiscalus mexicanus
- Nicaraguan grackle, Quiscalus nicaraguensis

== New World warblers ==
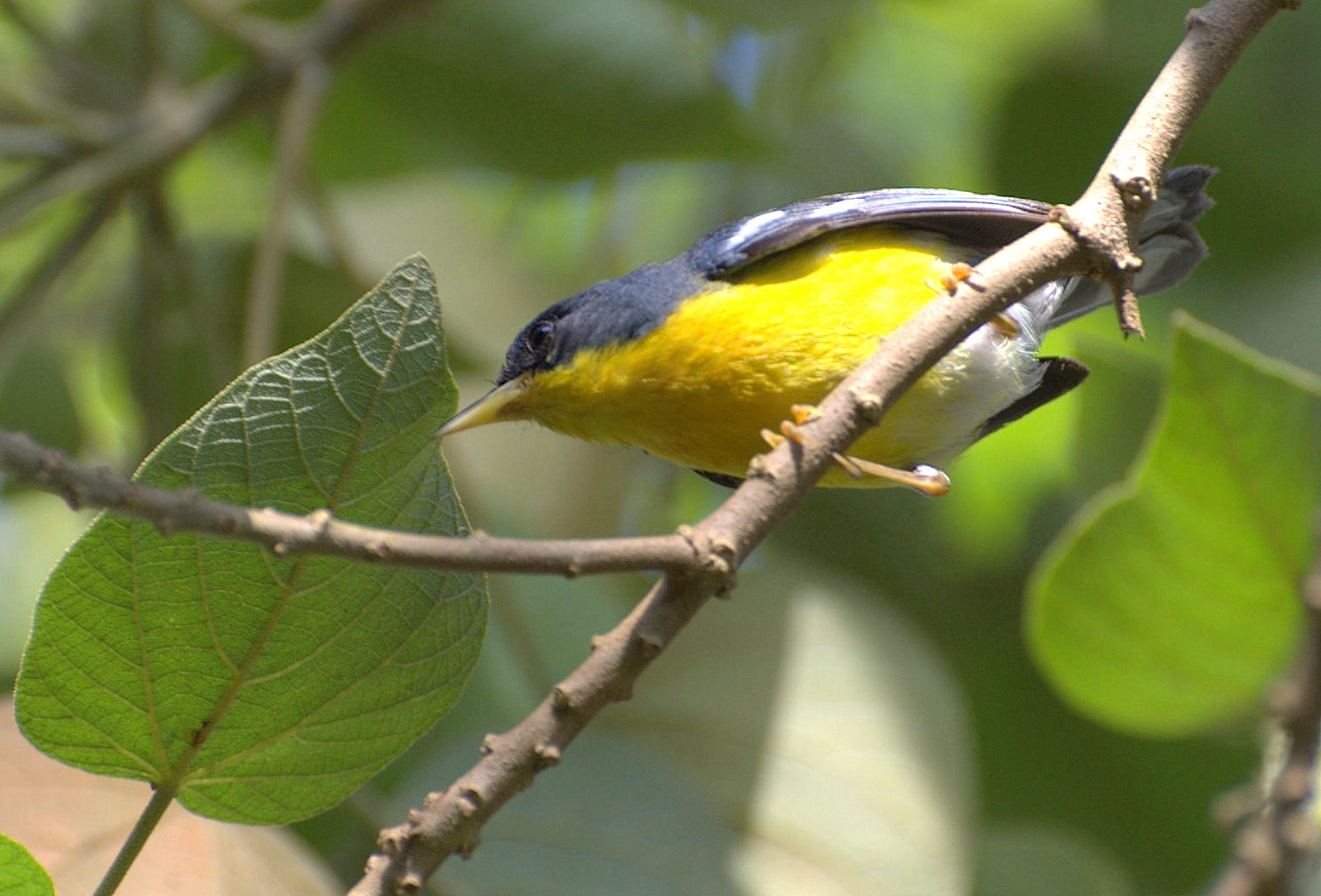
Tropical parula

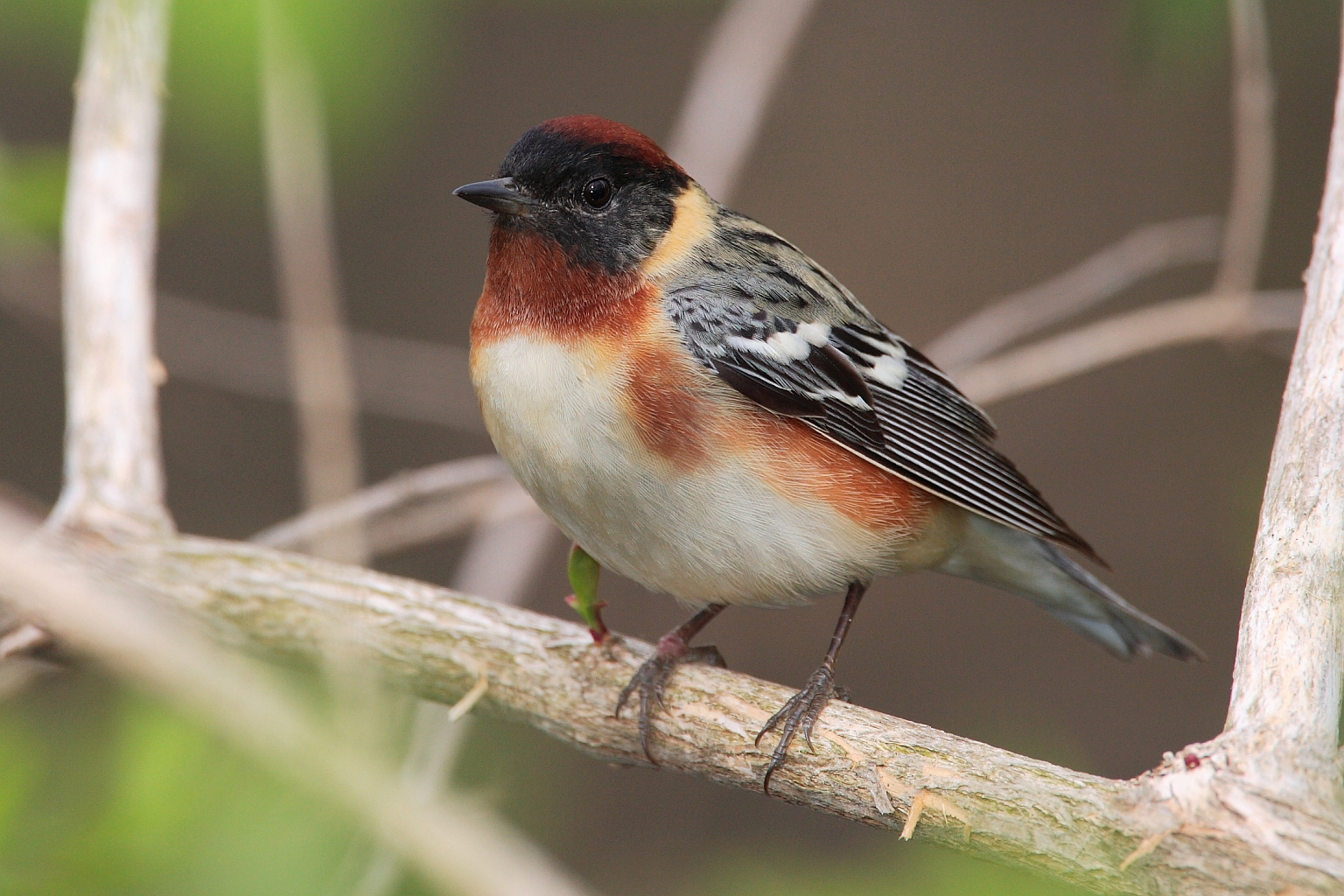
Bay-breasted warbler

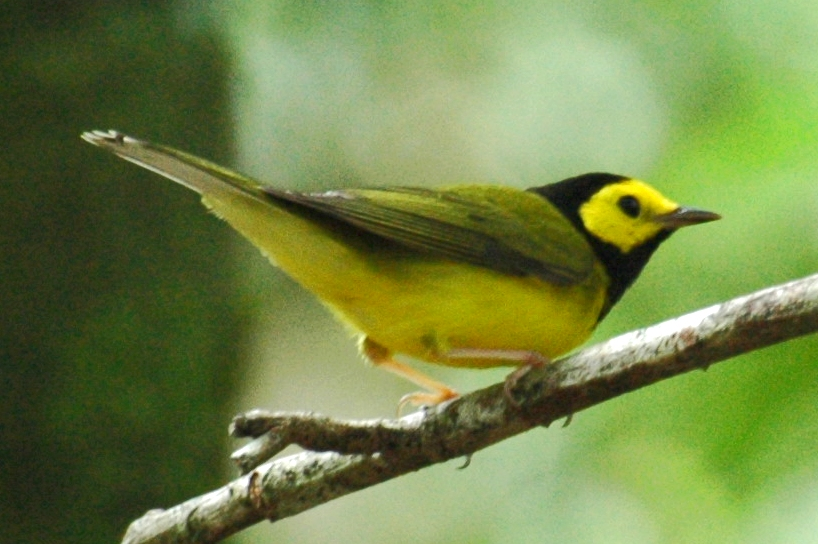
Hooded warbler

Order: Passeriformes Family: Parulidae

The New World warblers are a group of small, often colorful, passerine birds restricted to the New World. Most are arboreal, but some are terrestrial. Most members of this family are insectivores.

- Ovenbird, Seiurus aurocapilla
- Worm-eating warbler, Helmitheros vermivorum
- Louisiana waterthrush, Parkesia motacilla
- Northern waterthrush, Parkesia noveboracensis
- Golden-winged warbler, Vermivora chrysoptera
- Blue-winged warbler, Vermivora cyanoptera
- Black-and-white warbler, Mniotilta varia
- Prothonotary warbler, Protonotaria citrea
- Flame-throated warbler, Leiothlypis gutturalis (E-R)
- Tennessee warbler, Leiothlypis peregrina
- Orange-crowned warbler, Leiothlypis celata
- Nashville warbler, Leiothlypis ruficapilla
- Connecticut warbler, Oporornis agilis (A)
- Gray-crowned yellowthroat, Geothlypis poliocephala
- MacGillivray's warbler, Geothlypis tolmiei
- Mourning warbler, Geothlypis philadelphia
- Kentucky warbler, Geothlypis formosa
- Olive-crowned yellowthroat, Geothlypis semiflava
- Common yellowthroat, Geothlypis trichas
- Hooded warbler, Setophaga citrina
- American redstart, Setophaga ruticilla
- Cape May warbler, Setophaga tigrina
- Cerulean warbler, Setophaga cerulea (vulnerable)
- Northern parula, Setophaga americana
- Tropical parula, Setophaga pitiayumi
- Magnolia warbler, Setophaga magnolia
- Bay-breasted warbler, Setophaga castanea
- Blackburnian warbler, Setophaga fusca
- Yellow warbler, Setophaga petechia
- Chestnut-sided warbler, Setophaga pensylvanica
- Blackpoll warbler, Setophaga striata
- Black-throated blue warbler, Setophaga caerulescens
- Palm warbler, Setophaga palmarum
- Pine warbler, Setophaga pinus
- Yellow-rumped warbler, Setophaga coronata
- Yellow-throated warbler, Setophaga dominica
- Prairie warbler, Setophaga discolor
- Townsend's warbler, Setophaga townsendi
- Hermit warbler, Setophaga occidentalis
- Golden-cheeked warbler, Setophaga chrysoparia (endangered)
- Black-throated green warbler, Setophaga virens
- Buff-rumped warbler, Myiothlypis fulvicauda
- Chestnut-capped warbler, Basileuterus delattrii
- Black-cheeked warbler, Basileuterus melanogenys (E-R)
- Golden-crowned warbler, Basileuterus culicivorus
- Costa Rican warbler, Basileuterus melanotis (E-R)
- Canada warbler, Cardellina canadensis
- Wilson's warbler, Cardellina pusilla
- Slate-throated redstart, Myioborus miniatus
- Collared redstart, Myioborus torquatus (E-R)

== Cardinals and allies ==
Order: Passeriformes Family: Cardinalidae

The cardinals are a family of robust, seed-eating birds with strong bills. They are typically associated with open woodland. The sexes usually have distinct plumages.

- Hepatic tanager, Piranga flava
- Summer tanager, Piranga rubra
- Scarlet tanager, Piranga olivacea
- Western tanager, Piranga ludoviciana
- Flame-colored tanager, Piranga bidentata
- White-winged tanager, Piranga leucoptera
- Red-crowned ant-tanager, Habia rubica
- Red-throated ant-tanager, Habia fuscicauda
- Black-cheeked ant-tanager, Habia atrimaxillaris (E) (endangered)
- Carmiol's tanager, Chlorothraupis carmioli
- Black-faced grosbeak, Caryothraustes poliogaster
- Black-thighed grosbeak, Pheucticus tibialis (E-R)
- Rose-breasted grosbeak, Pheucticus ludovicianus
- Black-headed grosbeak, Pheucticus melanocephalus (A)
- Blue seedeater, Amaurospiza concolor
- Blue-black grosbeak, Cyanoloxia cyanoides
- Blue bunting, Cyanocompsa parellina (A)
- Blue grosbeak, Passerina caerulea
- Indigo bunting, Passerina cyanea
- Painted bunting, Passerina ciris
- Dickcissel, Spiza americana

== Microspingid tanagers ==
Order: Passeriformes Family: Mitrospingidae

The members of this small family were previously included in Thraupidae ("true" tanagers). They were placed in this new family in 2017.

- Dusky-faced tanager, Mitrospingus cassinii

== Tanagers and allies ==
Order: Passeriformes Family: Thraupidae

The tanagers are a large group of small to medium-sized passerine birds restricted to the New World, mainly in the tropics. Many species are brightly colored. As a family they are omnivorous, but individual species specialize in eating fruits, seeds, insects, or other types of food. Most have short, rounded wings.

- Blue-and-gold tanager, Bangsia arcaei (E-R)
- Speckled tanager, Ixothraupis guttata
- Blue-gray tanager, Thraupis episcopus
- Yellow-winged tanager, Thraupis abbas (R?)
- Palm tanager, Thraupis palmarum
- Golden-hooded tanager, Stilpnia larvata
- Spangle-cheeked tanager, Tangara dowii (E-R)
- Plain-colored tanager, Tangara inornata
- Rufous-winged tanager, Tangara lavinia
- Bay-headed tanager, Tangara gyrola
- Flame-faced tanager, Tangara parzudakii (A)
- Emerald tanager, Tangara florida
- Silver-throated tanager, Tangara icterocephala
- Swallow tanager, Tersina viridis (A)
- Grassland yellow-finch, Sicalis luteola (A)
- Slaty finch, Haplospiza rustica
- Peg-billed finch, Acanthidops bairdi (E-R)
- Slaty flowerpiercer, Diglossa plumbea (E-R)
- Green honeycreeper, Chlorophanes spiza
- Black-and-yellow tanager, Chrysothlypis chrysomelas (E-R)
- Sulphur-rumped tanager, Heterospingus rubrifrons (E-R)
- Blue-black grassquit, Volatinia jacarina
- Gray-headed tanager, Eucometis penicillata
- White-shouldered tanager, Loriotus luctuosus
- Tawny-crested tanager, Tachyphonus delattrii
- White-lined tanager, Tachyphonus rufus
- White-throated shrike-tanager, Lanio leucothorax
- Crimson-collared tanager, Ramphocelus sanguinolentus
- Flame-rumped tanager, Ramphocelus flammigerus (A)
- Scarlet-rumped tanager, Ramphocelus passerinii
- Crimson-backed tanager, Ramphocelus dimidiatus (A)
- Shining honeycreeper, Cyanerpes lucidus
- Red-legged honeycreeper, Cyanerpes cyaneus
- Scarlet-thighed dacnis, Dacnis venusta
- Blue dacnis, Dacnis cayana
- Bananaquit, Coereba flaveola
- Yellow-faced grassquit, Tiaris olivaceus
- Cocos finch, Pinaroloxias inornata (E) (vulnerable)
- Lesson's seedeater, Sporophila bouvronides (A)
- Lined seedeater, Sporophila lineola (A)
- Thick-billed seed-finch, Sporophila funerea
- Nicaraguan seed-finch, Sporophila nuttingi
- Variable seedeater, Sporophila corvina
- Slate-colored seedeater, Sporophila schistacea
- Morelet's seedeater, Sporophila morelleti
- Yellow-bellied seedeater, Sporophila nigricollis
- Ruddy-breasted seedeater, Sporophila minuta
- Wedge-tailed grass-finch, Emberizoides herbicola
- Black-headed saltator, Saltator atriceps
- Olive-gray saltator, Saltator olivascens
- Buff-throated saltator, Saltator maximus
- Slate-colored grosbeak, Saltator grossus
- Cinnamon-bellied saltator, Saltator grandis
- Blue-gray saltator, Saltator coerulescens
- Streaked saltator, Saltator striatipectus
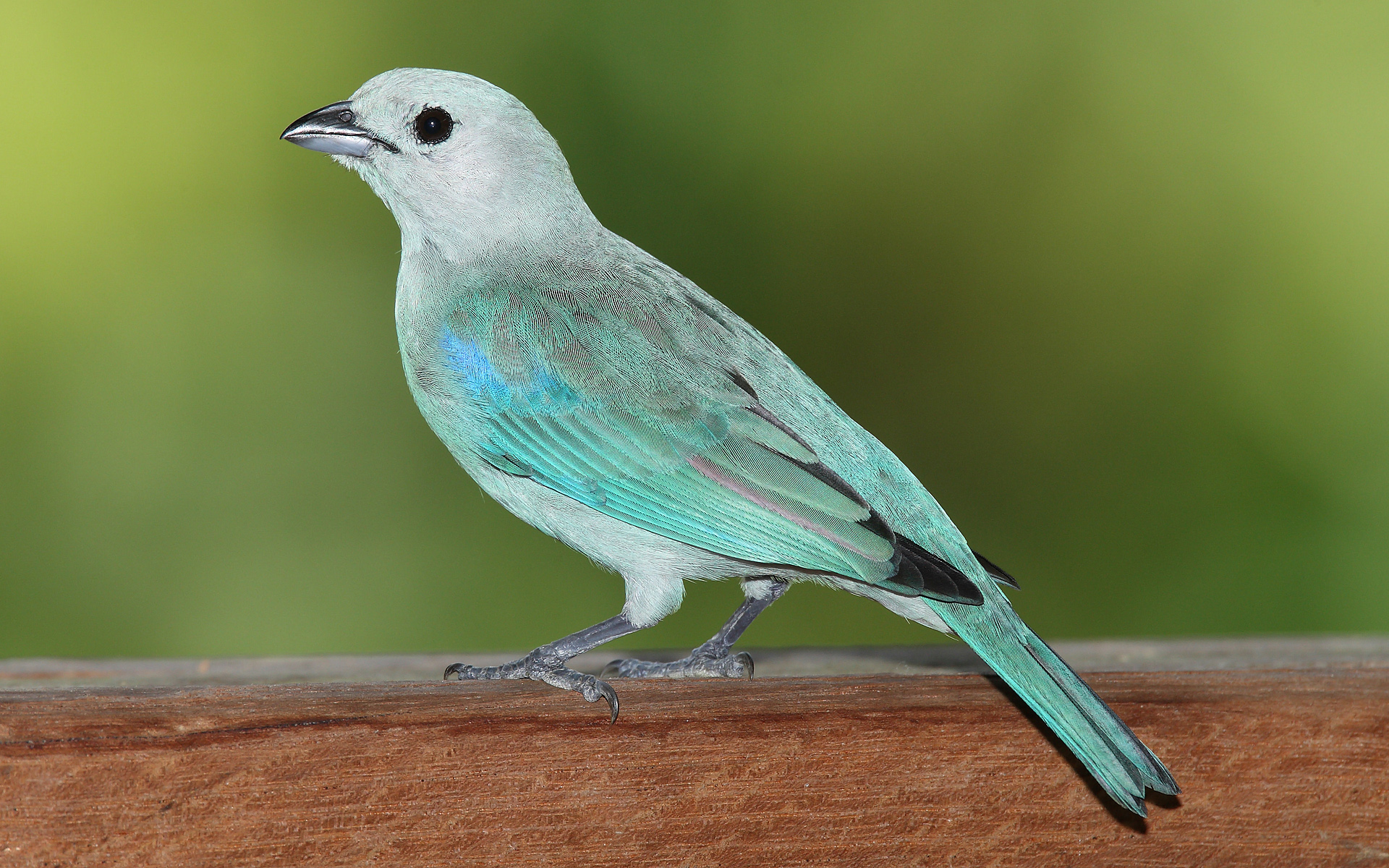
Blue-gray tanager

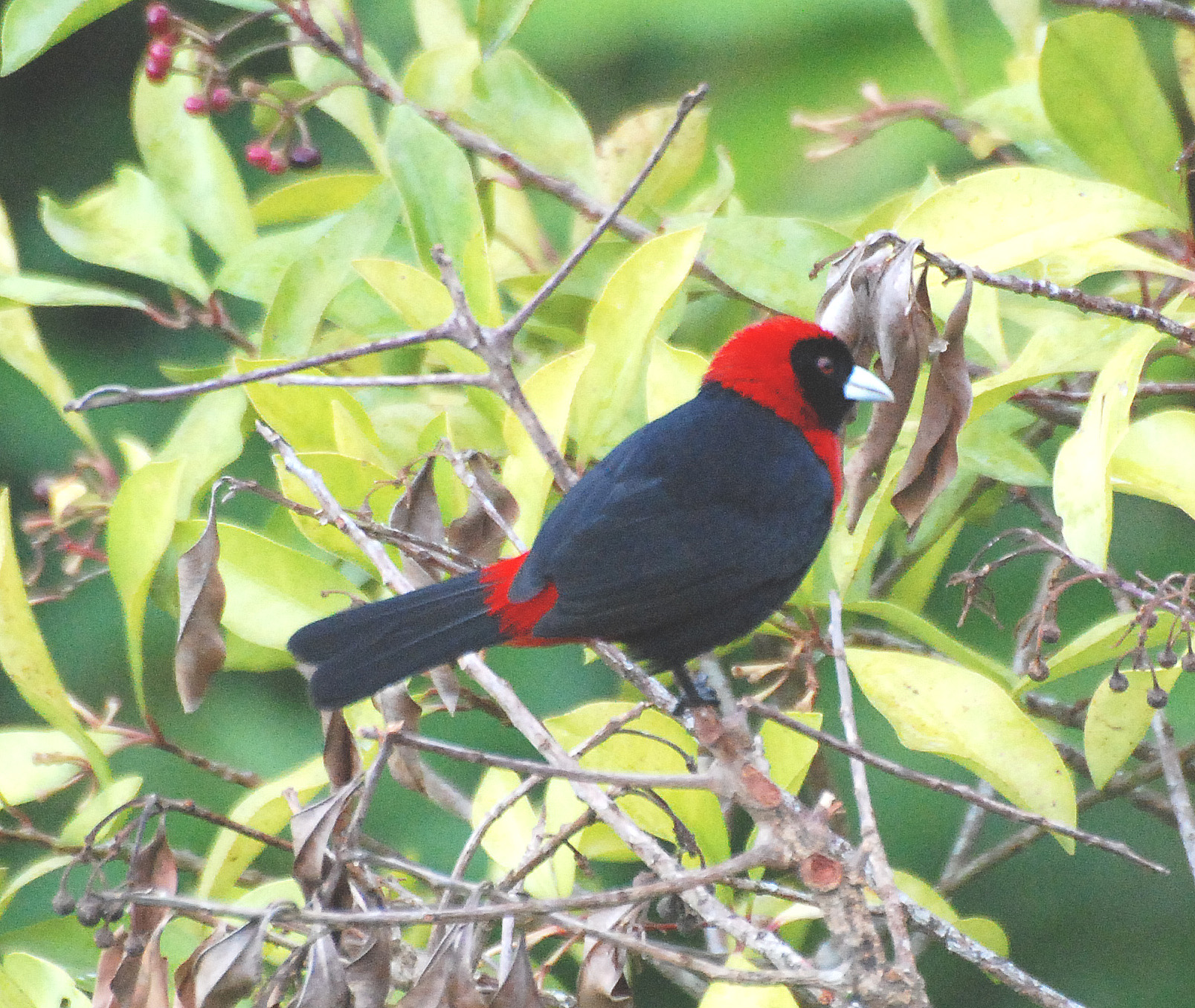
Crimson-collared tanager

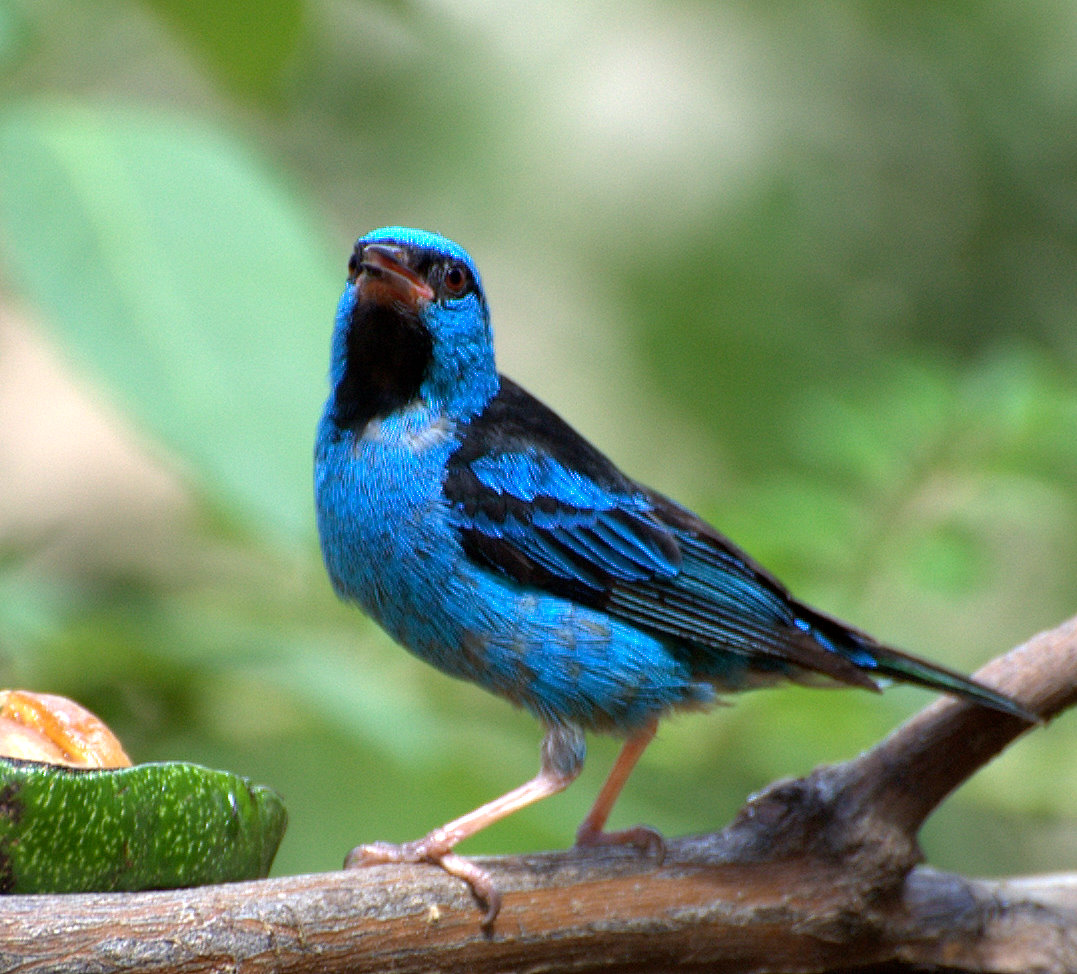
Blue dacnis

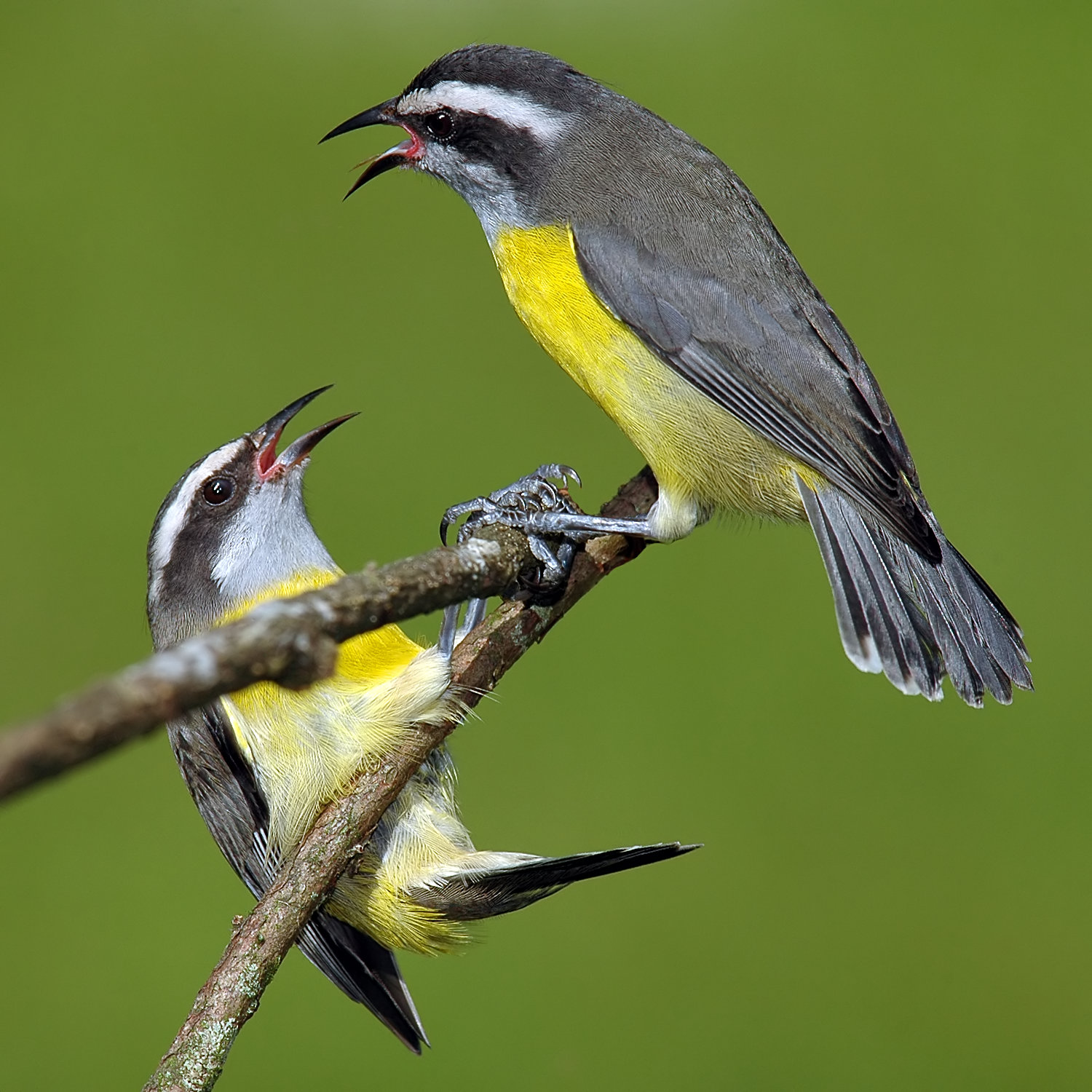
Bananaquit

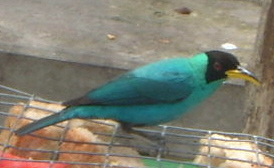
Green honeycreeper

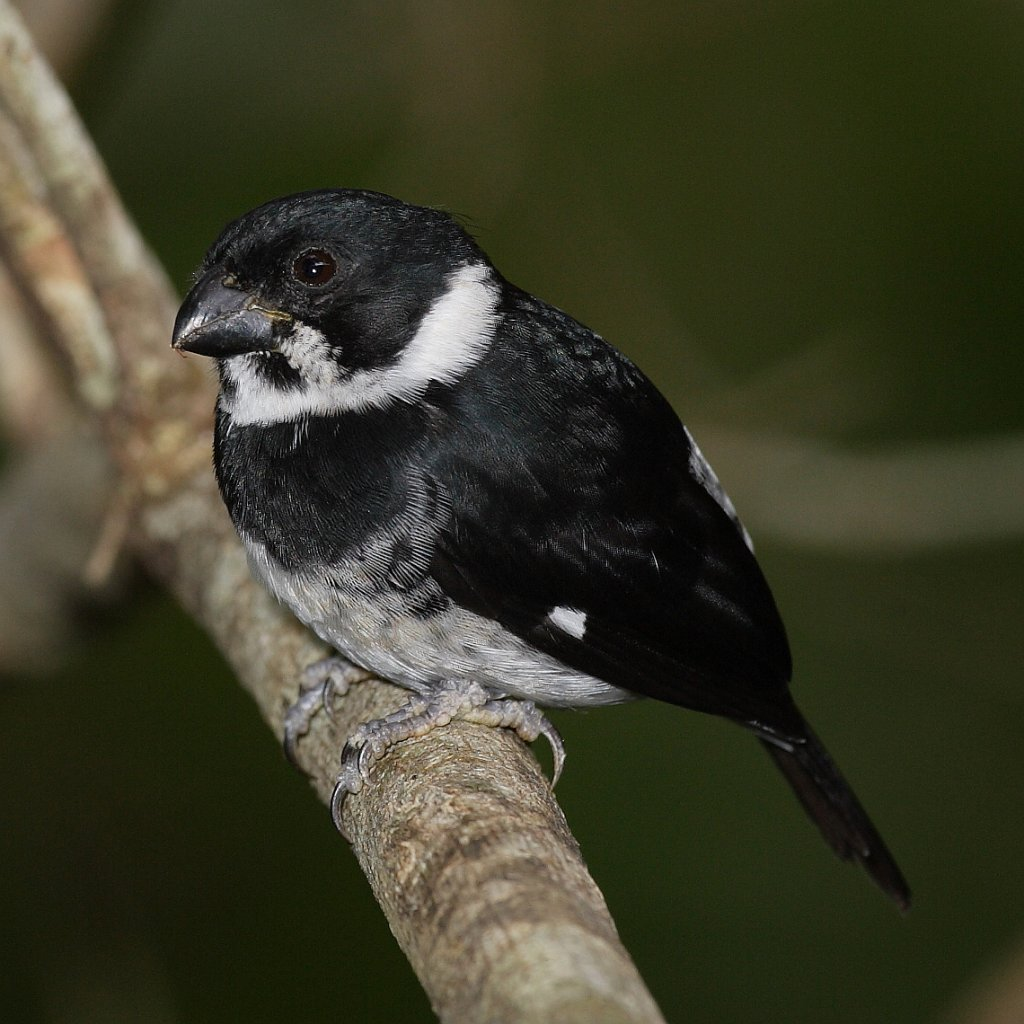
Variable seedeater

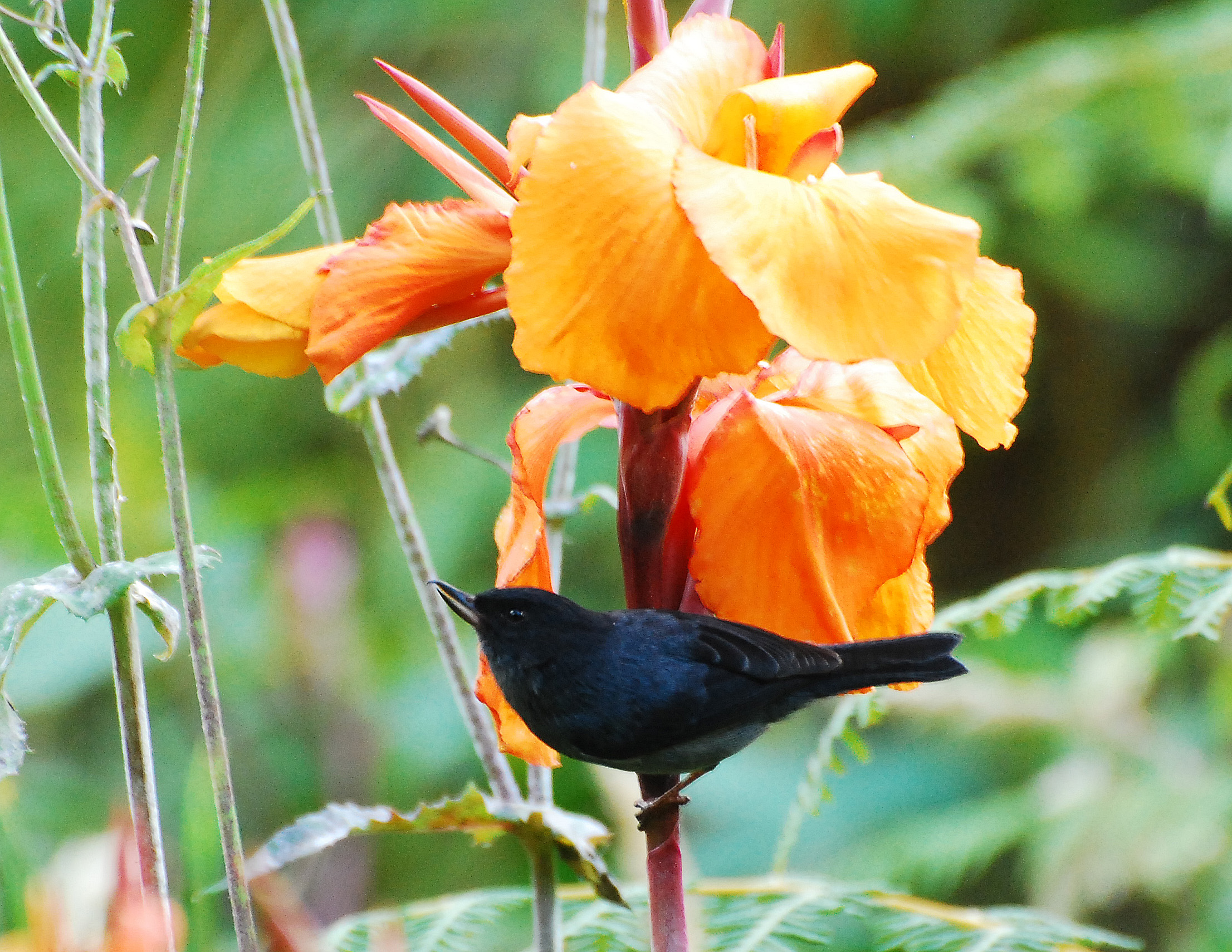
Slaty flowerpiercer

== See also ==
- List of amphibians of Costa Rica
- List of birds
- Lists of birds by region
- List of mammals of Costa Rica
- List of non-marine molluscs of Costa Rica
- List of reptiles of Costa Rica
