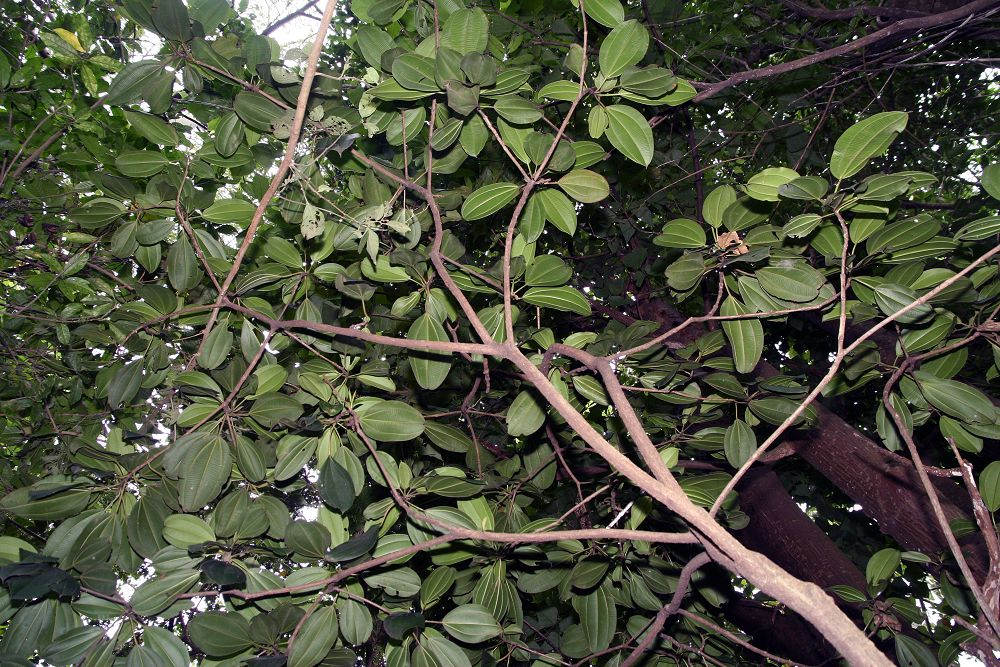
- Topobea maurofernandeziana, c.2008

Scientific classification
- Kingdom: Plantae
- Clade: Tracheophytes
- Clade: Angiosperms
- Clade: Eudicots
- Clade: Rosids
- Order: Myrtales
- Family: Melastomataceae
- Genus: Topobea; Aubl.

= Topobea =

Genus of flowering plants

Topobea is a genus of flowering plants in the family Melastomataceae. A 2013 study indicated that it is actually part of the genus Blakea.

Species include:

- Topobea asplundii Wurdack
- Topobea brevibractea Gleason
- Topobea cutucuensis Wurdack
- Topobea eplingii Wurdack
- Topobea induta Markgr.
- Topobea macbrydei Wurdack
- Topobea maguirei Wurdack
- Topobea parvifolia (Gleason) Almeda
- Topobea pascoensis Wurdack
- Topobea toachiensis Wurdack
- Topobea verrucosa Wurdack
