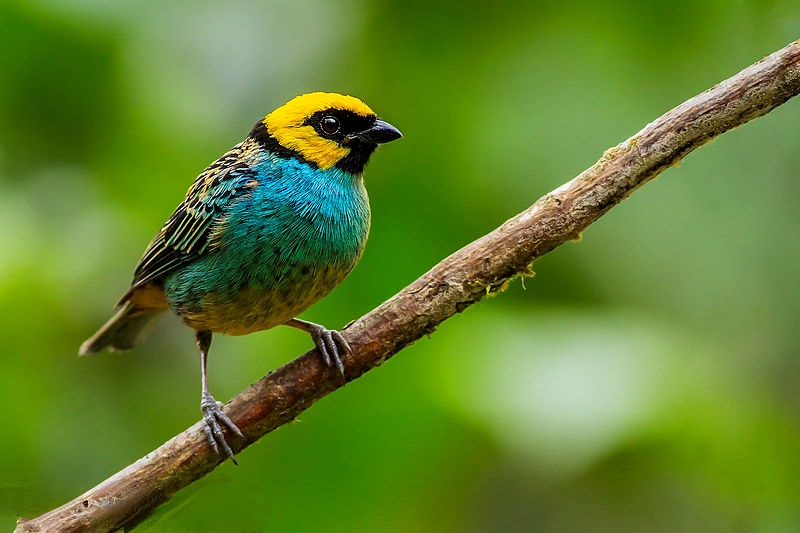

Conservation status
- Least Concern (IUCN 3.1)

Scientific classification
- Kingdom: Animalia
- Phylum: Chordata
- Class: Aves
- Order: Passeriformes
- Family: Thraupidae
- Genus: Tangara
- Species: T. xanthocephala

Binomial name
- Tangara xanthocephala (Tschudi, 1844)
- Distribution of the saffron-crowned tanager

Synonyms
- Callospiza xanthocephala Tschudi, 1844; Calliste lamprotis Sclater, 1851; Calliste venusta Sclater, 1855

= Saffron-crowned tanager =

Species of bird from South America

The saffron-crowned tanager (Tangara xanthocephala) is a species of bird in the family Thraupidae. Found in the northern Andes of Bolivia, Colombia, Ecuador, Peru, and Venezuela, it inhabits cloud forest, forest edges, and secondary forest, preferring areas with mossy trees. It is an average-sized species of tanager with a blue-green body and yellow head with a black forecrown, lores, orbital area, and chin.

It forages in pairs or small groups of 3–7 individuals that are part of mixed-species flocks. It is the most frugivorous species in the genus Tangara, although it also feeds on insects. It forms breeding pairs and is thought to be socially monogamous. The only known nest contained a clutch of two eggs. It is listed as being a species of least concern by the International Union for Conservation of Nature (IUCN) on the IUCN Red List, but may be threatened by habitat destruction.

== Taxonomy and systematics ==
The saffron-crowned tanager was first described as Callospiza xanthocephala by Johann Tschudi in 1844 based on a specimen from Peru. The generic name Tangara is from the Tupí word tangara, meaning "dancer". The specific name xanthocephala is from the Ancient Greek ξανθος (xanthos), meaning yellow, and κεφαλος (kephalos), meaning -headed. Saffron-crowned tanager is the official common name designated by the International Ornithologists' Union. Other names for the species include saffron crowned tanager.

It is one of 27 species in the genus Tangara. Within the genus, it was placed in a species group with the blue-whiskered tanager, green-and-gold tanager, emerald tanager, golden tanager, silver-throated tanager, golden-eared tanager, and flame-faced tanager by Isler and Isler in 1987. This placement is supported by a 2004 study of mitochondrial DNA by Kevin Burns and Kazuya Naoki. Within the species group, the saffron-crowned tanager is sister to a clade formed by blue-whiskered tanager, green-and-gold tanager, emerald tanager, golden tanager, silver-throated tanager, and flame-faced tanager. The following cladogram shows phylogenetic relationships within the species group based on the above study:

- - Golden-eared tanager (Tangara chrysotis)
  - - Saffron-crowned tanager (Tangara xanthocephala)
    - - - Blue-whiskered tanager (Tangara johannae)
        - - Green-and-gold tanager (Tangara schrankii)
          - Flame-faced tanager (Tangara parzudakii)
      - - - Silver-throated tanager (Tangara icterocephala)
          - Emerald tanager (Tangara florida)
        - - Golden tanager (Tangara arthus)

=== Subspecies ===
There are three recognized subspecies of the saffron-crowned tanager, which differ in the color of their crown.

- T. x. venusta (Sclater, PL, 1855): Occurs from southern Venezuela to central Peru. It has a pure yellow crown.
- T. x. xanthocephala (Tschudi, 1844): The nominate, it is found in central Peru.
- T. x. lamprotis (Sclater, PL, 1851): Occurs from southeastern Peru to Bolivia. The crown is orange-yellow.

== Description ==
The saffron-crowned tanager is an average-sized species of tanager, with a length of 12.5–13.5 cm (4.9–5.3 in) and a mass of 15–23.6 g (0.53–0.83 oz). Both sexes look similar. Adults have a blue-green body with blackish streaking on the back. The forecrown, lores, orbital area (region around the eyes), and chin are black, while the rest of the head is yellow, with an orange tinge to the crown. The wings and tail feathers are black, edged blue-green. The center of the belly and the undertail coverts are buff. The iris is dark brown, the bill is black, and the feet are gray. Juveniles are similar to adults but duller and more greenish. They also have yellowish-green instead of yellow on the head and buff-edged underparts.

The saffron-crowned tanager may be confused with the golden-eared and flame-faced tanagers. It can be distinguished by the former's black mid-crown and nape, and by the latter's solid black back and opalescent patch on wing coverts.

=== Vocalizations ===
The saffron-crowned tanager's calls include a thin, high-pitched tsit and a high-pitched descending tsew. Its songs may be a series of squeaky, high-pitched notes.

== Distribution and habitat ==
The saffron-crowned tanager is found in the Andes of Bolivia, Colombia, Ecuador, Peru, and Venezuela, where it inhabits cloud forests, forest edges, and secondary forest. It is also found in shaded plantations and large trees next to clearings and pastures. The species shows a preference for areas with mossy trees and inhabits elevations between 1,000–2,700 m (3,300–8,900 ft).

== Behavior and ecology ==
The saffron-crowned tanager is generally found in pairs or small groups of 3–10 individuals, mainly in mixed-species flocks with other species of tanagers and other canopy birds. In Venezuela, it is most often seen with the beryl-spangled tanager, golden tanager, and black-capped tanager.

=== Diet ===
The saffron-crowned tanager is the most frugivorous species in its genus. Fruits consumed include Cecropia, Morus, Miconia, and others in the family Melostomataceae. It also feeds on insects. The species is very active while foraging, with individuals constantly moving around or hopping while foraging. Foraging occurs primarily in the canopy, although fruit is foraged at all heights. Fruit is mainly gleaned while upright, but insects are foraged mainly from mossy branches by inspecting both sides of the branch, and then reaching into clumps of moss or sticking its whole head into moss.

=== Breeding ===
The saffron-crowned tanager forms breeding pairs and is thought to be socially monogamous. Individuals in breeding plumage have been reported from March–July. Juveniles have been reported in April in Venezuela, in March, April, and September in Colombia, in February, April, and August in Peru, and in November and December in Bolivia. The only known nest was found in November and was placed at a height of 12 m (39 ft) in moss on the underside of the lowest branch of a tree, containing a clutch of two eggs.

== Status ==
The saffron-crowned tanager is listed as being a species of least concern by the International Union for Conservation of Nature (IUCN) on the IUCN Red List due to its large range and lack of significant population decline. However, the species is threatened by habitat destruction.
