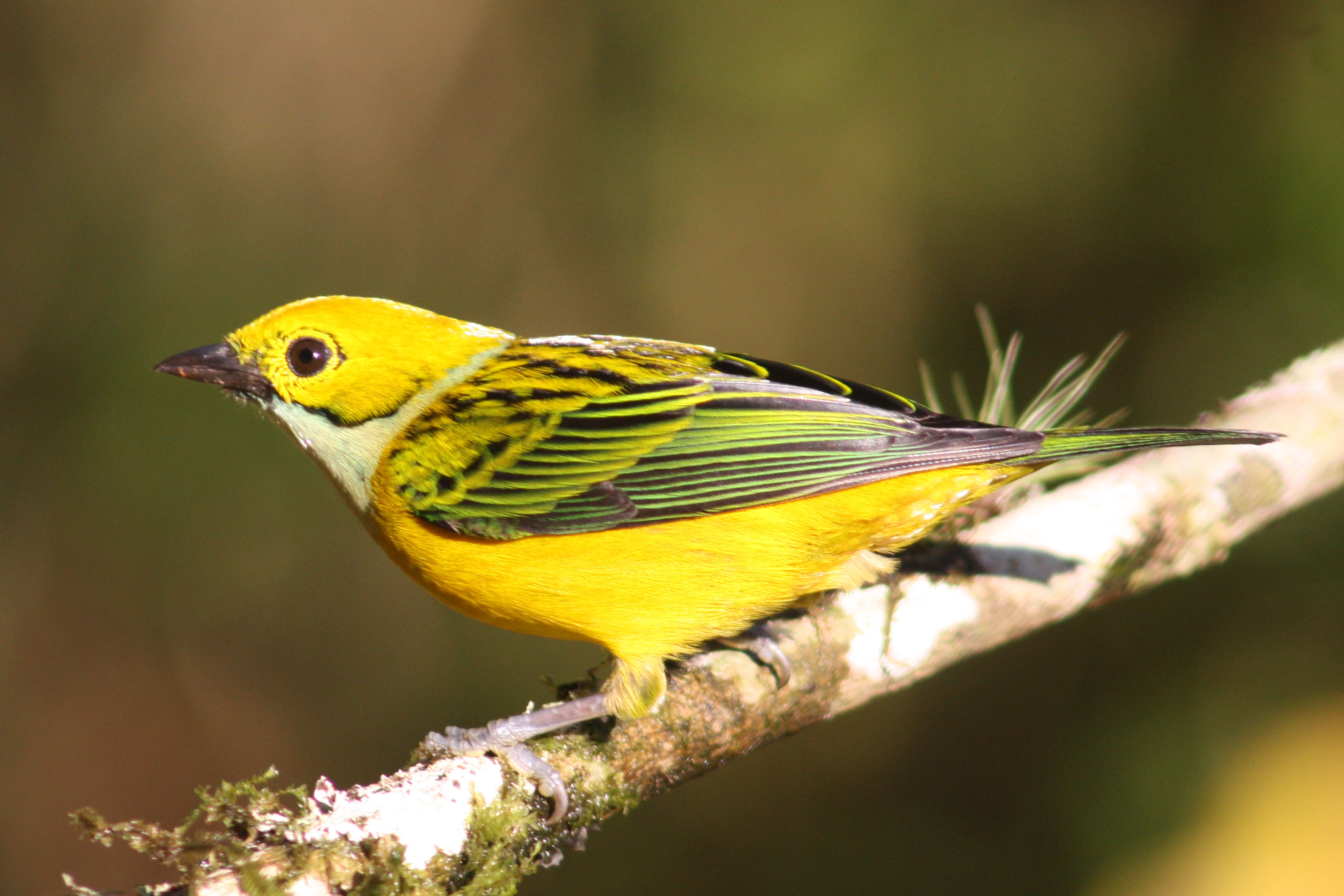
- T. i. frantzii, Costa Rica

Conservation status
- Least Concern (IUCN 3.1)

Scientific classification
- Kingdom: Animalia
- Phylum: Chordata
- Class: Aves
- Order: Passeriformes
- Family: Thraupidae
- Genus: Tangara
- Species: T. icterocephala

Binomial name
- Tangara icterocephala (Bonaparte, 1851)
- Silver-throated tanager range

= Silver-throated tanager =

Species of bird from South America

The silver-throated tanager (Tangara icterocephala) is a species of passerine bird in the tanager family Thraupidae. It is found in Costa Rica, Panama, Colombia, Ecuador, and northeastern Peru. It inhabits mossy forests, montane forests, tropical lowland evergreen forests and forest edges, along with tall secondary forests and disturbed habitat with remnant trees and forest. It is 13 centimetres (5.1 in) long and weighs 22 grams (0.78 oz) on average, and shows slight sexual dimorphism, with duller female plumage. Adult males are mainly bright yellow, with a silvery-white throat bordered above with a black stripe on the cheeks, black streaking on the back, and green edges to the wings and tail. Juveniles are duller and greener.

The silver-throated tanager is omnivorous, and mainly feeds on fruits, especially melastomes, supplemented with arthropods. Breeding occurs from April–September, and two broods are raised in a single breeding season. Cup nests are built by females out of moss, leaves, and spider webs in forests or isolated trees. Eggs are laid in clutches of two and incubated by females. Nestlings leave the nest at around 15 days old. The silver-throated tanager is listed as being of least concern by the International Union for Conservation of Nature (IUCN) on the IUCN Red List, but is threatened by habitat destruction.

== Taxonomy and systematics ==
The silver-throated tanager was first described as Calliste icterocephala by Charles Lucien Bonaparte in 1851 on the basis of a specimen from Ecuador. The genus Calliste was subsequently synonymized with Calospiza, which itself was later lumped with Tangara. The generic name Tangara comes from the Tupí word tangara, meaning dancer. The specific name icterocephala is from the Ancient Greek words ikteros, meaning yellow, and kephalos, meaning headed. Silver-throated tanager is the official common name designated by the International Ornithologists' Union.

The silver-throated tanager is one of 27 species in the genus Tangara, in the tanager family Thraupidae. According to a 2004 study of mitochondrial DNA by Kevin Burns and Kazuya Naoki, it is part of a species group with the blue-whiskered tanager, green-and-gold tanager, emerald tanager, golden tanager, saffron-crowned tanager, golden-eared tanager, and flame-faced tanager within the genus. Within this group, it is sister to the emerald tanager. The clade formed by these two species is sister to the golden tanager. The following cladogram shows phylogenetic relationships within the species group based on the above study:

- - Golden-eared tanager (Tangara chrysotis)
  - - Saffron-crowned tanager (Tangara xanthocephala)
    - - - Blue-whiskered tanager (Tangara johannae)
        - - Green-and-gold tanager (Tangara schrankii)
          - Flame-faced tanager (Tangara parzudakii)
      - - - Silver-throated tanager (Tangara icterocephala)
          - Emerald tanager (Tangara florida)
        - - Golden tanager (Tangara arthus)

=== Subspecies ===
There are three recognized subspecies of the silver-throated tanager. The subspecies are differentiated by differences in their appearance and their distribution.

- T. i. frantzii (Cabanis, 1861): It is found from northern Costa Rica south to both slopes of mountains in Veraguas, Panama. It has a bright yellow crown and nape, with an indistinct pale greenish-blue band across the latter. Its foreneck and throat is paler than that of the other two subspecies.
- T. i. oresbia Wetmore, 1962: It is found in the mountains of Coclé and Panamá Province in Panama. It is the darkest of the subspecies, with a greenish-blue band on the neck and dark forelocks and throats. Females have dark green edges to the back feathers, contrasting with the yellow seen in other subspecies.
- T. i. icterocephala (Bonaparte, 1851): The nominate subspecies, it is found in the mountains of eastern Darién, Panama, and the Andes of Colombia, western Ecuador, and northeastern Peru.

== Description ==
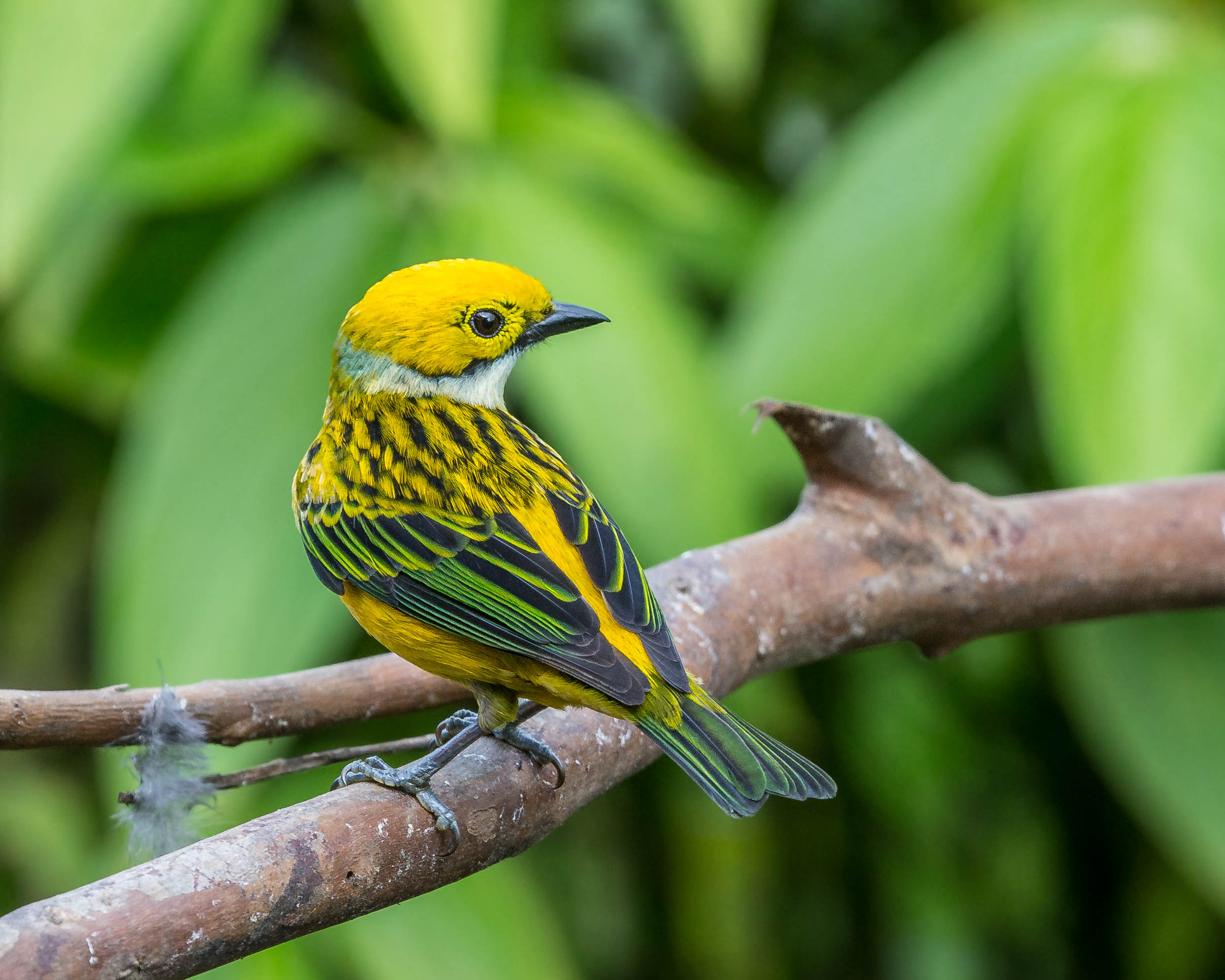
In Costa Rica

The silver-throated tanager is an average-sized Tangara tanager, being 13 centimetres (5.1 in) long and weighing 22 grams (0.78 oz) on average. The species shows slight sexual dimorphism, with females being duller than males. The male is mainly bright yellow, with a silvery-white throat bordered above with a black stripe on the cheeks. The back is yellow with black streaking, and the wings and tail are yellow with green edges. The iris is brown, the beak is black, and the feet are gray. Adult females look similar to males, but have duller and greener plumage, and occasional faint dark mottling on the crown. Immatures are much duller and greener, with dusky wings, tail, back streaks and cheek stripe, a grey throat and darker green wing edging. This subadult plumage is kept through to the end of the first breeding season.

=== Vocalizations ===
The silver-throated tanager's calls are insect-like buzzes. When foraging or flying, the species has been recorded giving a harsh, buzzy jjeut, or a high-pitched bzeeet. It also gives a high-pitched tic. Its songs have not been described.

== Distribution and habitat ==
It is found from northern Costa Rica through Panama, Colombia, and Peru to southern Ecuador, mainly at elevations of 600–1,800 m (2,000–5,900 ft), but occasionally from 0–2,300 m (0–7,546 ft). It inhabits mossy forests, montane forests, tropical lowland evergreen forests and forest edges, along with tall secondary forests. It also inhabits disturbed habitats with remnant trees and forest. It has been observed in clearings with fruit trees next to forests in Costa Rica, but rarely leaves forested habitat in Colombia.

== Behavior ==
Silver-throated tanagers forage in pairs, small groups, or as part of a mixed-species feeding flock. Flocks of silver-throated tanagers consist of 3–5 individuals, and up to 12 individuals may be present in mixed-species flocks with other tanagers, vireos, and wood warblers. Mated pairs of the species are present year-round, but become looser after the end of the breeding season in November to December. Individuals have been observed bathing themselves in water that had collected in areas such as hollows in tree branches.

=== Diet ===
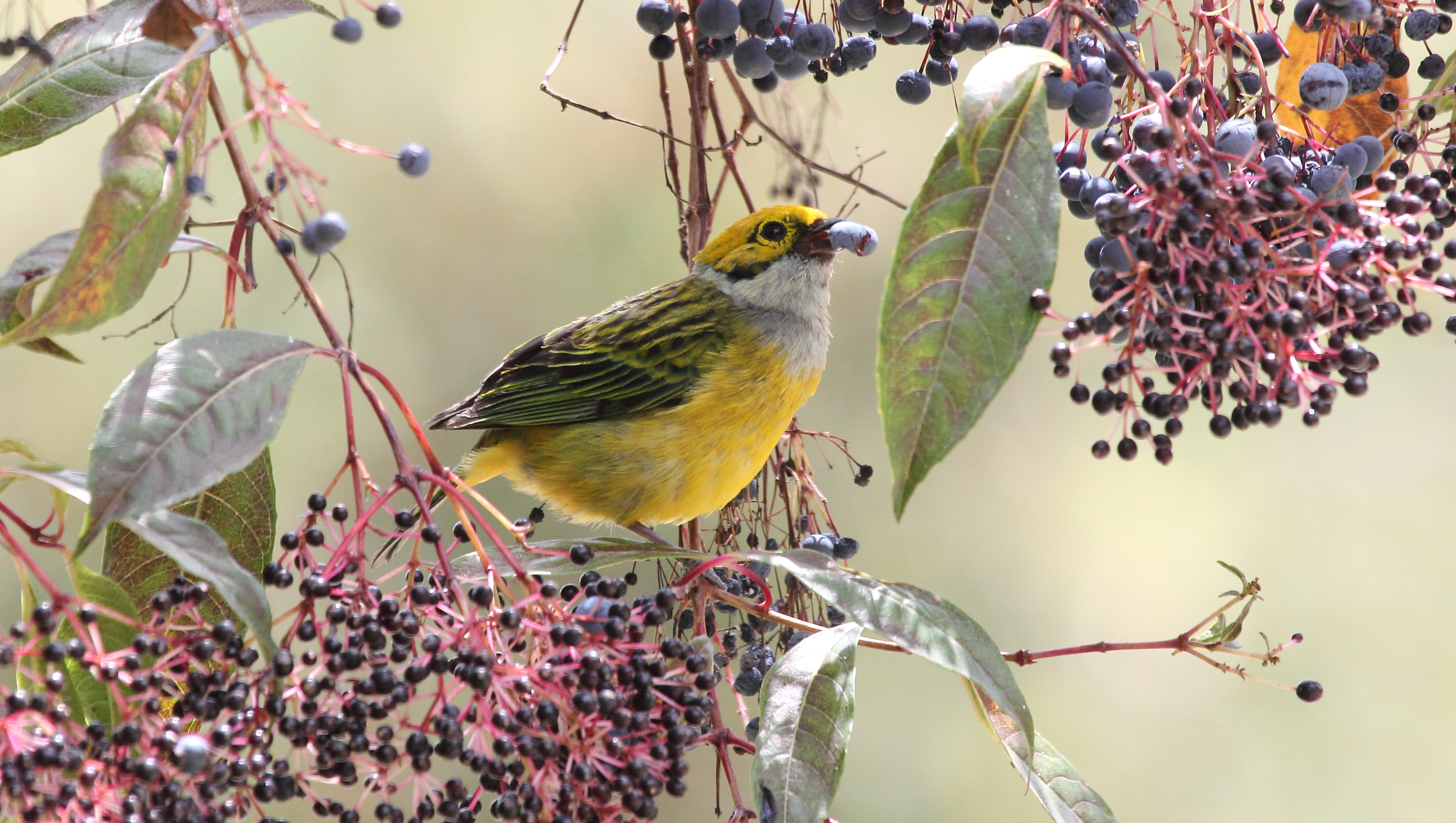
Silver-throated tanager feeding

Silver-throated tanagers are omnivorous, mainly feeding on fruit and supplementing their diet with arthropods. The main fruits eaten are melastomes, especially those from the genus Miconia. It has also been observed feeding on fruits of Souroubea guianensis. Arthropods form a greater percentage of the diet during the breeding season.

Silver-throated tanagers forage in the canopy, mostly perching on or hanging from upside-down branches to eat small fruit. In Colombia, foraging occurs in the crowns of trees and shrubs at an average height of 8.5 m (28 ft) and rarely below 3 m (9.8 ft), but foraging occurs closer to the ground in Costa Rica. Foraging for arthropods occurs on thin moss-covered branches. They move quickly from branch to branch, and move in sprints down the branch while looking for arthropods. They also glean insects from small branches.

=== Breeding ===
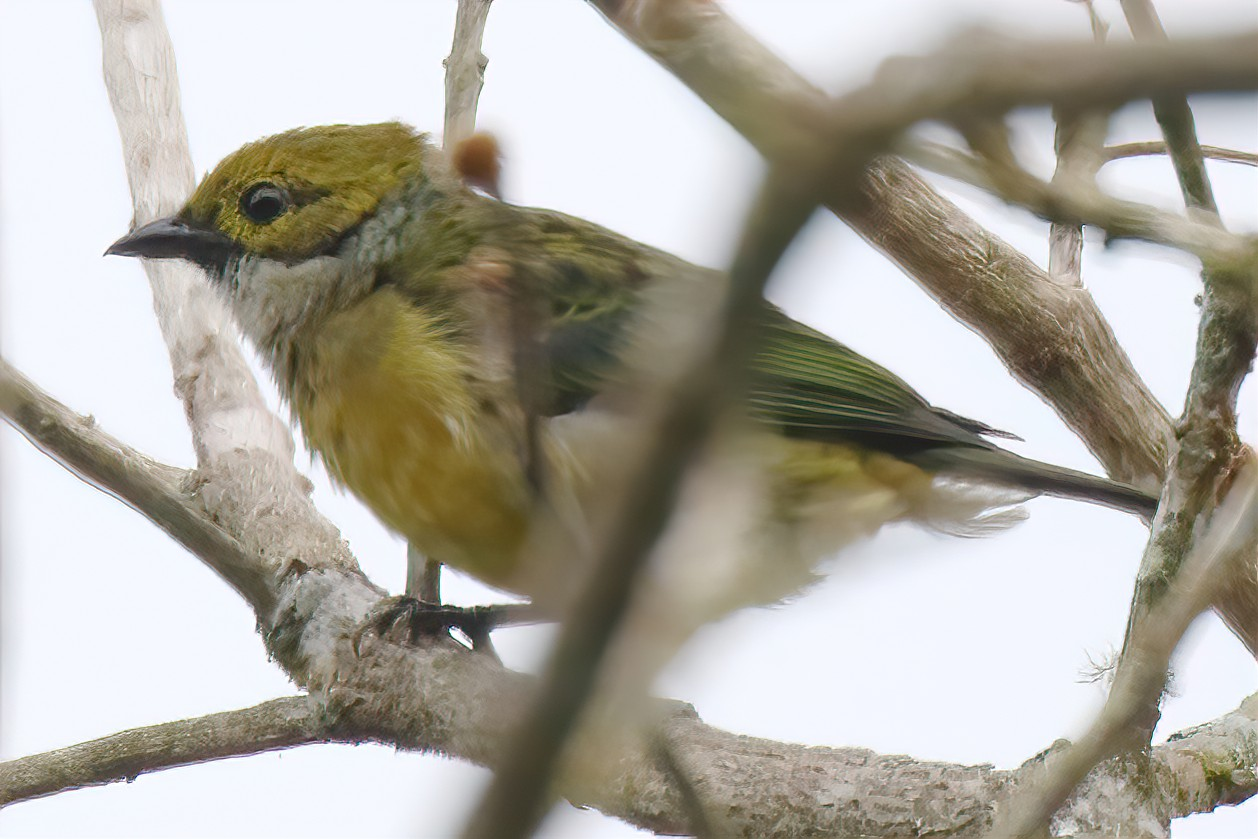
Juvenile in Costa Rica

In Costa Rica, breeding occurs from April–September, when the silver-throated tanager has two broods. Females start building nests in April and are the only ones to make nests, although males bring food and nesting material for their partners. Nests are mainly built in forested areas at heights of 1.8–10.7 m (5.9–35.1 ft), but may also be made in isolated trees. The nests are cup-shaped and built of moss and leaves surrounded with spider webs, mainly hidden among moss-covered branches.

Eggs are laid in clutches of two on consecutive days. They are off-white to dull gray in color, with brown mottling that is concentrated at the larger end, and measure 21.3–15.6 mm (0.84–0.61 in) on average. Females are the only ones that incubate the eggs. Both parents feed the young, and nestlings leave the nest after around 15 days, when they are able to look after themselves. On average, 54.3% of nests and 44.7% of eggs are successful.

=== Parasites ===
A survey in Costa Rica found the parasitic alveolate Haemoproteus coatneyi in the blood of silver-throated tanagers. The silver-throated tanager is also the type host of the chewing louse Myrsidea icterocephalae.

== Status ==
The silver-throated tanager is listed as being of least concern by the International Union for Conservation of Nature (IUCN) on the IUCN Red List, due to its large range and lack of a rapid decline in population. However, the species' population is declining due to habitat destruction. Increases in tree density near open agricultural areas may increase the species' population.
