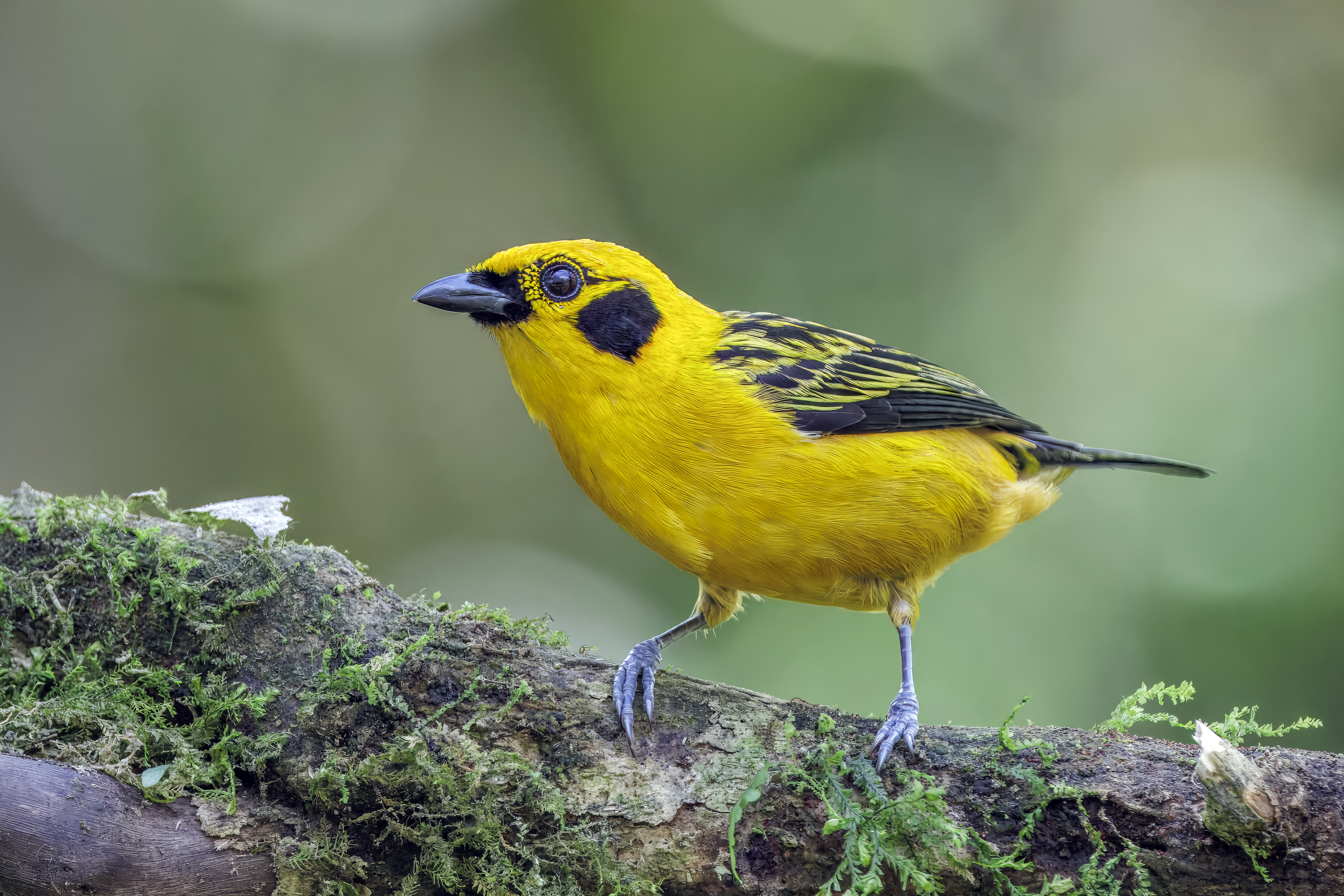
- T. a. goodsoni, Ecuador

Conservation status
- Least Concern (IUCN 3.1)

Scientific classification
- Kingdom: Animalia
- Phylum: Chordata
- Class: Aves
- Order: Passeriformes
- Family: Thraupidae
- Genus: Tangara
- Species: T. arthus

Binomial name
- Tangara arthus Lesson, R, 1832
- Range of the nominate subspecies
- Range of the other subspecies

= Golden tanager =

Species of bird

The golden tanager (Tangara arthus) is a species of bird in the family Thraupidae. It is widespread and often common in highland forests of the Andes (from Bolivia and northwards) and Venezuelan Coastal Range in north-western South America.

Its plumage is overall golden-yellow with black to the back, wings, tail and ear-coverts. Some subspecies are partially/largely brown below.

== Taxonomy and systematics ==
The golden tanager was first described as Tangara Arthus by René Lesson in 1840 on the basis of a specimen from Caracas, Venezuela. The generic name Tangara comes from the Tupí word tangara, meaning dancer. The specific name arthus is in honor of Arthus Bertrand, a French bookseller. Golden tanager is the official common name designated by the International Ornithologists' Union (IOC). Other names for the species include "chestnut-breasted tanager".

The golden tanager is one of 27 species in the genus Tangara. Within the genus, it is part of a species group with the blue-whiskered tanager, green-and-gold tanager, emerald tanager, silver-throated tanager, saffron-crowned tanager, golden-eared tanager, and flame-faced tanager. In the group, it is sister to a clade formed by the emerald and silver-throated tanagers. This placement is supported by mitochondrial DNA evidence. The following cladogram shows phylogenetic relationships within the species group based on the above study:

- - Golden-eared tanager (Tangara chrysotis)
  - - Saffron-crowned tanager (Tangara xanthocephala)
    - - - Blue-whiskered tanager (Tangara johannae)
        - - Green-and-gold tanager (Tangara schrankii)
          - Flame-faced tanager (Tangara parzudakii)
      - - - Silver-throated tanager (Tangara icterocephala)
          - Emerald tanager (Tangara florida)
        - - Golden tanager (Tangara arthus)

=== Subspecies ===
There are nine recognized subspecies of the golden tanager. The subspecies are differentiated by differences in their appearance and their distribution. All the subspecies excluding arthus are sometimes separated into a distinct species, Tangara aurulenta, on the basis of differences in plumage.

- T. a. arthus (Lesson, 1832): The nominate subspecies. It is found in the mountains of northern and western Venezuela.
- T. a. palmitae (Meyer de Schauensee, 1947): It is found on the western slope of the Andes in La Palmita, Santander, Colombia.
- T. a. sclateri (Lafresnaye, 1854): It is found in the Andes of eastern Colombia, and likely also in those of southern Táchira, Venezuela.
- T. a. aurulenta (Lafresnaye, 1843): It is found in Serranía del Perijá, Venezuela, and the western slope of the Andes in eastern Colombia.
- T. a. occidentalis Chapman, 1914: It is found on the western slope of the Andes in central Colombia and on both slopes in western Colombia.
- T. a. goodsoni Hartert, 1913: It is found on the western slope of the Andes in Ecuador, and likely also in northwestern Peru.
- T. a. aequatorialis (Taczanowski & Berlepsch, 1885): It is found on the eastern slope of the Andes in Ecuador and adjoining areas in northern Peru.
- T. a. pulchra (Tschudi, 1844): It is found on the eastern slope of the Andes from Amazonas to Junín in Peru.
- T. a. sophiae (Berlepsch, 1901): It is found on the eastern slope of the Andes from southeastern Peru to La Paz and Cochabamba in Bolivia.

== Distribution and habitat ==
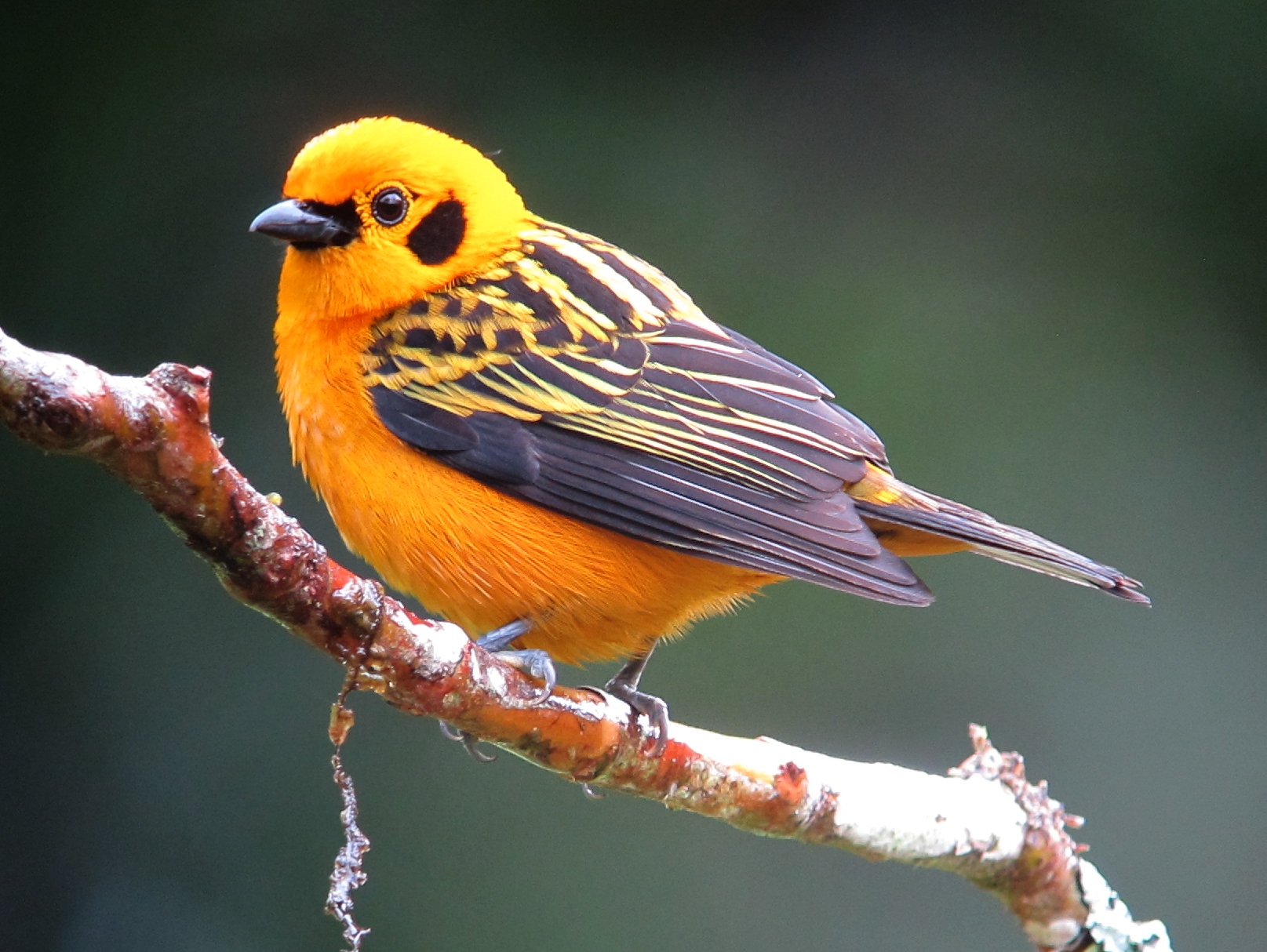
Cali, Valle, Colombia

The golden tanager is found in the Venezuelan Coastal Range in Venezuela and in the Andes in Colombia, Ecuador, Peru, and Bolivia at elevations of 700–2,500 m (2,300–8,200 ft), but is most common at elevations of 1,000–1,500 m (3,300–4,900 ft). It inhabits humid montane evergreen forest, as well as forest edges and nearby secondary growth.

== Status ==
The nominate subspecies of the golden tanager is listed as being a species of least concern by the International Union for Conservation of Nature (IUCN) on the IUCN Red List because of its large range, relative commonness, and lack of a sufficiently rapid decline in population. The other subspecies, which are considered to be a distinct species by the IUCN, are also listed as being of least concern for the above reasons. However, the population of the golden tanager is decreasing, and it is threatened by habitat destruction.
