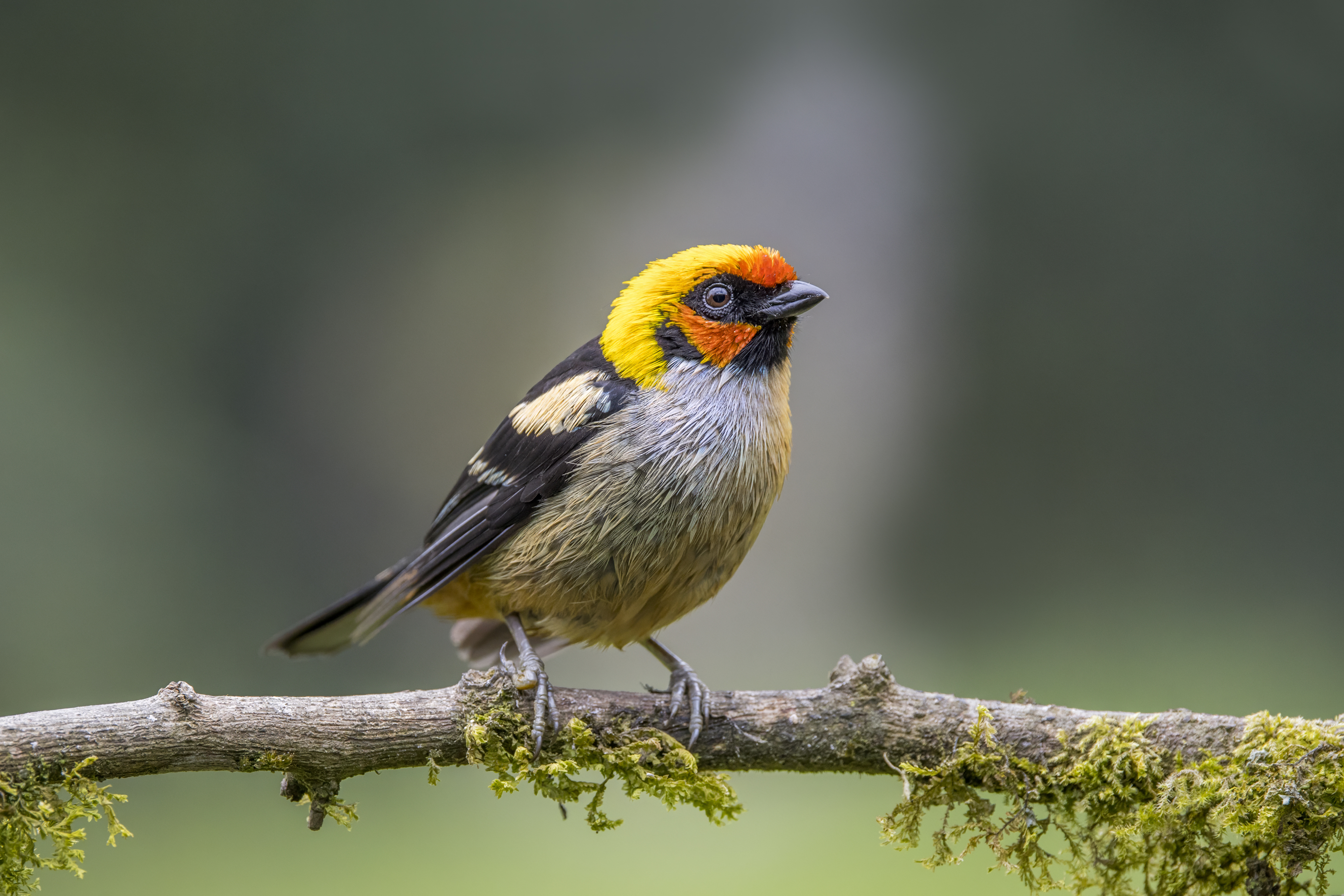
- T. p. parzudakii
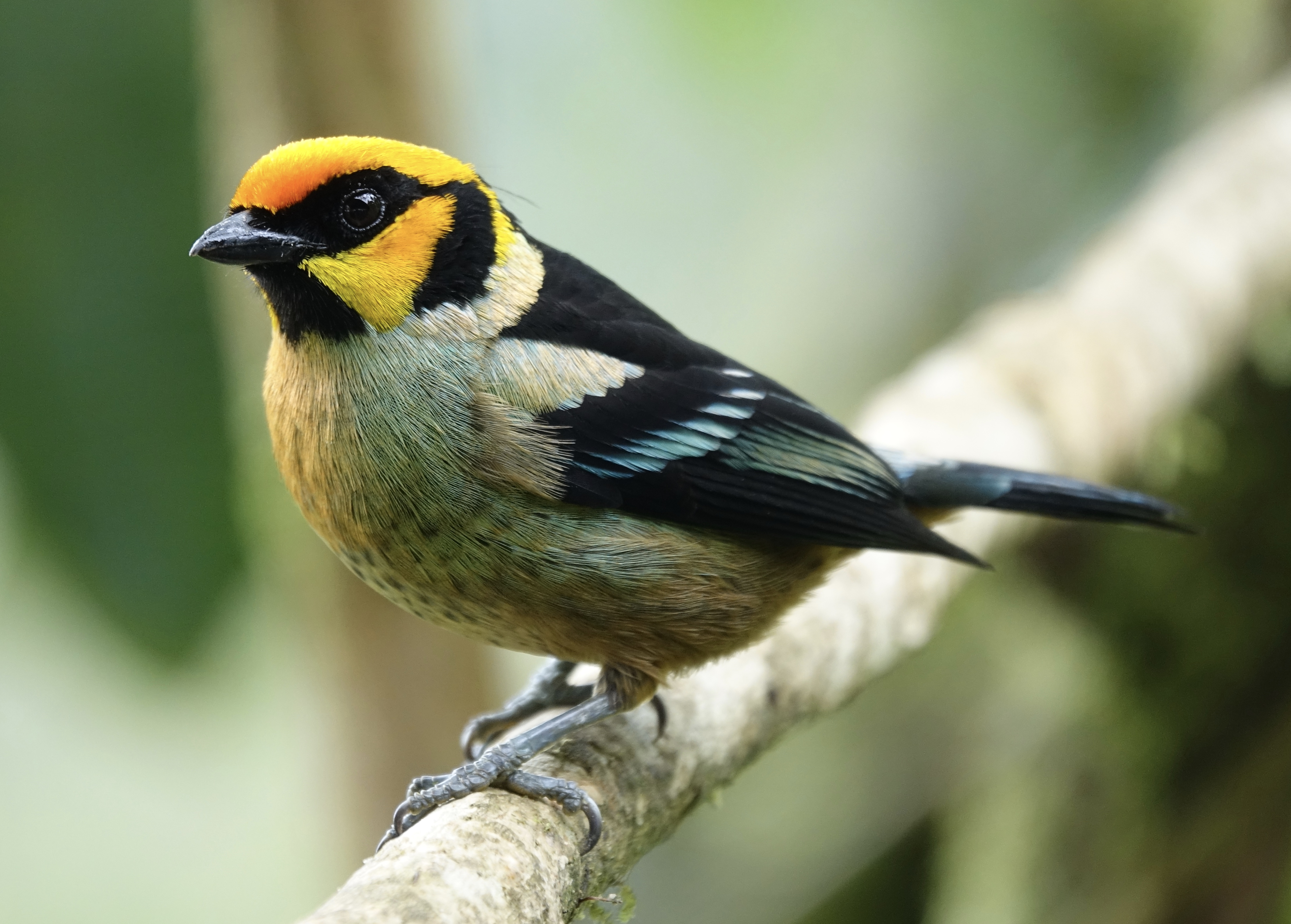
- T. p. lunigera

Conservation status
- Least Concern (IUCN 3.1)

Scientific classification
- Kingdom: Animalia
- Phylum: Chordata
- Class: Aves
- Order: Passeriformes
- Family: Thraupidae
- Genus: Tangara
- Species: T. parzudakii

Binomial name
- Tangara parzudakii (Lafresnaye, 1843)

Synonyms
- Tanagra Parzudakii (protonym); Tangara lunigera; Calliste lunigera

= Flame-faced tanager =

Species of bird from South America

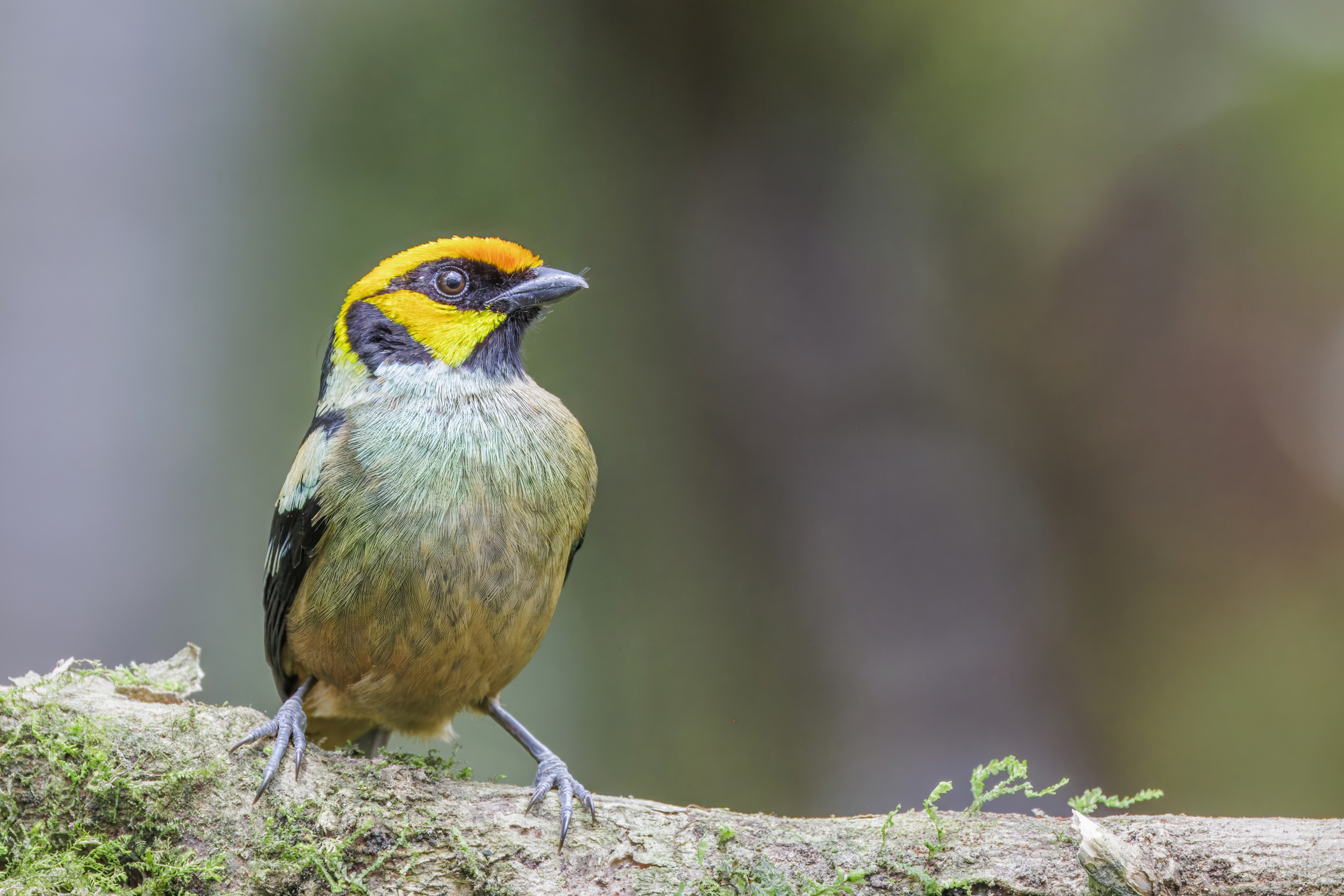
T. p. lunigera

The flame-faced tanager (Tangara parzudakii) is a species of bird in the tanager family Thraupidae. It is endemic to South America and is found in the eastern Andes of Colombia, Ecuador, Peru and Venezuela. Its natural habitat is subtropical or tropical moist montane forests. It is a distinctive-looking species with black and opalescent green upperparts, opalescent green and buff underparts, and a deep red and yellow face. The subspecies lunigera lacks the deep red on the face, which is replaced with orangish-red.

It is omnivorous and feeds on fruit and arthropods. Foraging is conducted nearly exclusively on mossy branches. Breeding occurs in the rainy season. Eggs are laid in clutches of two, and are white with pale brown flecking concentrated on the larger end. Fledglings are fed by both parents. The flame-faced tanager is listed as being of least concern by the International Union for Conservation of Nature (IUCN) on the IUCN Red List. However, it is facing population declines due to habitat destruction.

== Taxonomy and systematics ==
The flame-faced tanager was first described as Tanagra Parzudakii by Frédéric Lafresnaye in 1843, on the basis of specimens collected around Santa Fe, in Bogota, Colombia. The generic name Tangara comes from the Tupí word tangara, which means dancer. The specific epithet parzudakii is in honor of the French collector and natural history dealer Charles Parzudaki. Flame-faced tanager is the official common name designated by the International Ornithologists' Union (IOC). Other names for the species include flame faced tanager.

The flame-faced tanager is one of 27 species in the genus Tangara. Within the genus, it is put in a species group with the blue-whiskered tanager, green-and-gold tanager, emerald tanager, golden tanager, silver-throated tanager, saffron-crowned tanager, and golden-eared tanager. This placement has been supported by DNA evidence. However, it is not known which of the species in the group are sister to the flame-throated tanager.

=== Subspecies ===
There are three subspecies of the flame-faced tanager, all of which are recognized on the basis of slight differences in plumage.

- T. p. parzudakii (Lafresnaye, 1843): The nominate subspecies, it is found in southwestern Venezuela, the eastern Colombian Andes, and the east slope of the Ecuadorian Andes.
- T. p. urubambae Zimmer, 1943: It is found on the eastern slope of the Peruvian Andes. It is similar to the nominate, but has a smaller and stubbier beak, a paler crown, and a duller forecrown and belly.
- T. p. lunigera (P.L. Sclater, 1851): Also known as the yellow-faced tanager, it is found on the Pacific slope of the Colombian Andes, along with northwestern Ecuador at elevations of 1,000–2,600 m (3,300–8,500 ft). It has an orange-red face instead of a red one. It is recognized as a distinct species by some authorities.

== Description ==
The flame-faced tanager is a distinctive-looking medium-sized species of tanager, being on average 14–15 cm (5.5–5.9 in) in length and 28 g (0.99 oz) in mass. Both sexes of the species look similar.

The body is mostly black and silvery green. The auricle, malar surface, and forecrown is deep red, while the crown and nape are yellow. The underparts are mostly opalescent green mixed with buff. The central belly is pale cinnamon buff, while the flanks and undertail coverts are darker. The lower back and rump are opalescent golden, frequently with a bluish tinge. The iris is dark brown, the bill is black, and the feet are dark gray. Immatures have a dull yellow instead of red on the head. The throat is pale buffy gray, while parts that are black in adults are dull dusky. Overall, the plumage is duller than in the adult.

The nominate subspecies is unlikely to be mistaken for any other species due to the deep red facial plumage, but lunigera resembles the saffron-crowned tanager. However, it can be distinguished due to the latter's greenish breast, yellow crissum (area surrounding cloaca), and smaller size.

== Distribution and habitat ==
Flame-faced tanagers are found in the Andes of Colombia, Ecuador, Venezuela, and Peru, at elevations of 1,000–2,600 m (3,300–8,500 ft). It inhabits montane and cloud forests, and is most frequent at elevations above 1,500 m (4,900 ft). It is also found in forest edges and tall secondary growth.

== Behavior and ecology ==
The flame-faced tanager is most often found either in pairs or groups of 3–7 birds. It is also often found in mixed-species flocks, which are composed mostly of other tanager species. On average, mixed-species flocks containing the flame-faced tanager have seven other species in them.

=== Diet ===
Like other tanagers in its genus, the flame-faced tanager is omnivorous, and feeds on fruit, arthropods, flower buds, and nectar. Foraging is mainly done in the canopy. Preferred types of fruit include species of Miconia and Cecropia. More than half of fruit is collected through gleaning, but can also be collected through probing or other techniques. Arthropods are collected almost entirely from fully and partially moss-covered branches, through a variety of methods such as gleaning and probing.

=== Breeding ===
In Colombia, adults were observed feeding each other berries as a part of courtship in February. In Ecuador, populations of the subspecies parzudakii were observed breeding January–July, during the rainy season. Nests were observed mainly in pastures, but some were also found in forests, forest edges, and on man-made structures. Nests are built entirely by the female, in locations that were concealed from all sides. The male waits beside the female while nest building is ongoing, but does not directly help her. Nests are bulky, open cups made of stiff fibers, pieces of fern, moss, and other organic material. The nest is internally lined with dead leaves from Chusquea species, dried bromeliad leaves, and pale fibers. Three nests measured in Ecuador had an average outer diameter of 12.3 cm (4.8 in), inner diameter of 6 cm (2.4 in), outer height of 9.8 cm (3.9 in), and inner height of 4.5 cm (1.8 in).

The clutch size is two eggs, which are incubated by the female. Males feed the female berries while she is incubating. Eggs are white, with pale brown flecking that is densest at the larger end. A sample of five eggs from Ecuador measured on average 20 mm × 16.7 mm (0.79 in × 0.66 in), with an average mass of 3.2 g (0.11 oz). Nests with fledglings have been observed in May. Fledglings are fed by both parents. Common food items given include arthropods such as katydids, butterflies and moths, and spiders, and mashed fruits, including berries. Nests inhabited by fledglings are also regularly probed, which helps remove parasites. Fledglings are born without feathers or hair.

== Status ==
The flame-faced tanager is listed as a species of least concern by the International Union for Conservation of Nature (IUCN) on the IUCN Red List, due to its large range and relative commonness. However, its population is declining due to habitat destruction in its range. The subspecies lunigera, which is recognized as a separate species by the IUCN, is also classified as least concern for the above reasons.
