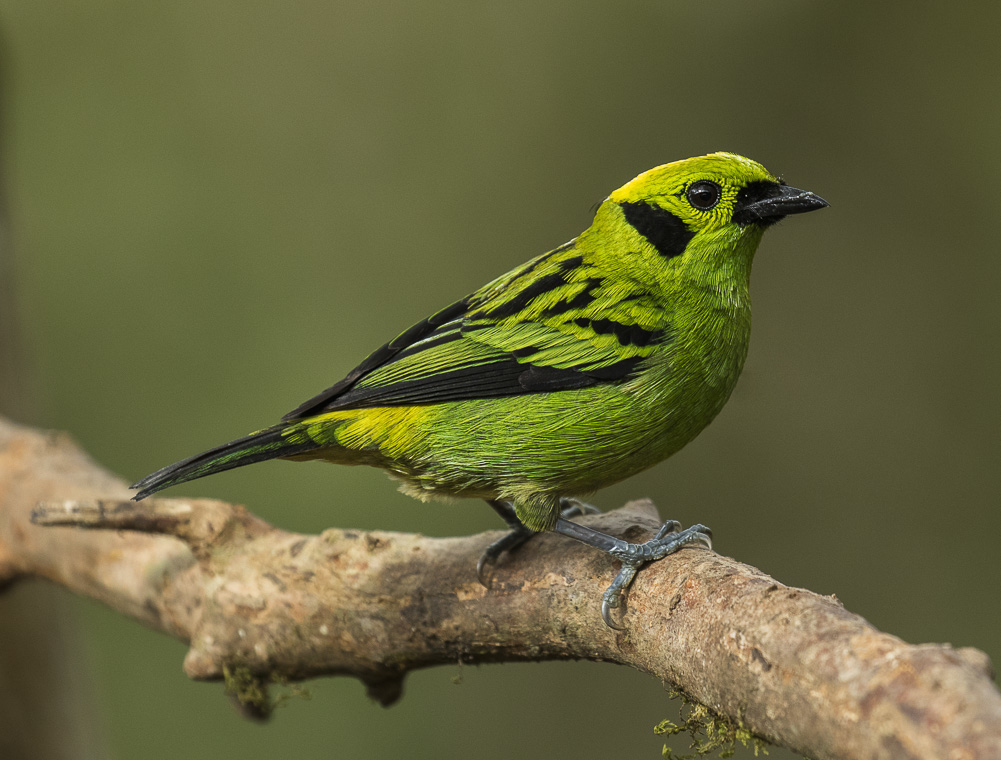

Conservation status
- Least Concern (IUCN 3.1)

Scientific classification
- Kingdom: Animalia
- Phylum: Chordata
- Class: Aves
- Order: Passeriformes
- Family: Thraupidae
- Genus: Tangara
- Species: T. florida

Binomial name
- Tangara florida (Sclater, PL & Salvin, 1869)
- Distribution

Synonyms
- Calliste florida Sclater & Salvin, 1869

= Emerald tanager =

Species of bird from South America

The emerald tanager (Tangara florida) is a species of bird in the tanager family Thraupidae. It is found in Colombia, Costa Rica, Ecuador, and Panama. Described by the English ornithologists PL Sclater and Osbert Salvin in 1869, it is a medium-sized species that has a length of 10.6–13 cm (4.2–5.1 in) and a mass of 18–20.5 g (0.63–0.72 oz). It can be identified by its bright green plumage, with black streaking on the back and wings, and a black auricular patch and beak. It also has yellow on the crown and rump. The species shows slight sexual dimorphism, with the females being duller and having yellow-green in place of yellow on the head.

The emerald tanager mainly inhabits humid lowland forest, montane evergreen forest, and secondary forest at elevations of 500–900 m (1,600–3,000 ft) but can be found from 100–1,200 m (330–3,940 ft). It is omnivorous and feeds mainly on fruit, flowers, and flower buds, supplementing its diet with arthropods. It breeds from March to May in Costa Rica and from January to April in Colombia. The emerald tanager makes cup nests out of moss, where eggs are laid in clutches of two.

It is listed as being of least concern by the International Union for Conservation of Nature (IUCN) on the IUCN Red List due to its sufficiently large range and a lack of significant population decline, but is threatened by habitat destruction.

== Taxonomy and systematics ==
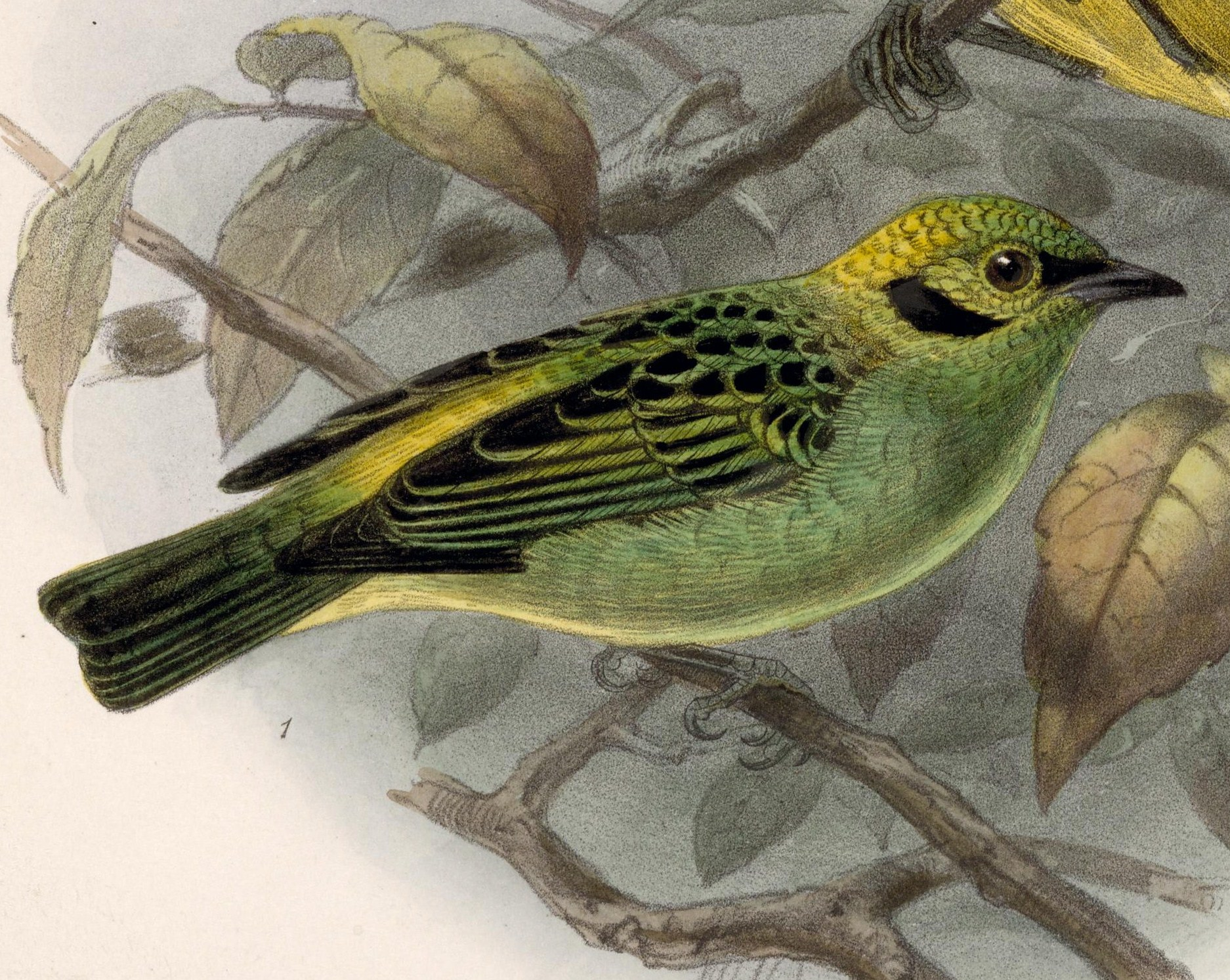
Illustrated by John Gerrard Keulemans.

The emerald tanager was first described as Calliste florida by the English ornithologists Philip Sclater and Osbert Salvin in 1869, based on a female specimen from Costa Rica that was collected by Julian Carmiol. The name of the genus, Tangara, comes from the Tupí word tangara, meaning "dancer". The specific name florida comes from the region of Florida. Emerald tanager is the official common name designated by the International Ornithologists' Union (IOU).

The emerald tanager is one of 27 species in the genus Tangara, a Neotropical genus of tanagers. According to a 2004 study of mitochondrial DNA by Kevin Burns and Kazuya Naoki, it belongs to a species group that includes the blue-whiskered tanager, green-and-gold tanager, golden tanager, silver-throated tanager, saffron-crowned tanager, golden-eared tanager, and flame-faced tanager. Out of these, it is most closely related to the silver-throated tanager. The following cladogram shows phylogenetic relationships within the species group based on the above study:

- Golden-eared tanager (Tangara chrysotis)
- - Saffron-crowned tanager (Tangara xanthocephala)
  - - - Blue-whiskered tanager (Tangara johannae)
      - - Green-and-gold tanager (Tangara schrankii)
        - Flame-faced tanager (Tangara parzudakii)
    - - - Silver-throated tanager (Tangara icterocephala)
        - Emerald tanager (Tangara florida)
      - - Golden tanager (Tangara arthus)

The emerald tanager is recognized as monotypic by the IOU. However, some authorities recognize populations from eastern Panama to Colombia and northwestern Ecuador as being a distinct subspecies, T. f. auriceps.

== Description ==
The emerald tanager is a medium-sized tanager with a length of 10.6–13 cm (4.2–5.1 in) and a mass of 18–20.5 g (0.63–0.72 oz). Both sexes are similar in appearance, but the species shows slight sexual dimorphism, with females being duller and having yellow-green instead of yellow on the head. It may be confused with the glistening-green tanager but can be told apart by its less intense plumage. It is also similar to the blue-whiskered tanager but can be distinguished by the latter's black face and throat and turquoise cheeks.

Adults males are mostly bright light green, with black streaking on the upperparts. The loral area, the base of the bill, and chin, along with the auricular patch, are also black. The center and rear of the crown are dark yellow, while the rest of the crown, the region around the eye, and the band across the back of the neck are yellowish-green. The upper back is black, while the lower back, rump, and uppertail coverts are dark yellow. The wings are black and green. The underparts are mostly light green, while the center of the belly and the undertail coverts are light yellow. The iris is brown, the bill is black and the feet are bluish-gray. Immatures resemble adult females, while juveniles are much duller. Juvenile males gain plumage similar to that of adult females after their first molt, while they gain adult male plumage after a second molt that occurs after their first breeding season.

=== Vocalizations ===
The emerald tanager makes a sharp chip or tsip which may be repeated and which occasionally accelerates into a rapid twitter. Its song is a series of loud cheet or chiip notes.

== Distribution and habitat ==
The emerald tanager is found from southern Costa Rica to northern Ecuador; through Panama and Colombia. It may also be found in extreme southern Nicaragua. There are two disjunct populations, separated by an area between Panama and the San Juan River. Throughout its range, the emerald tanager is commonest at elevations of 500–900 m (1,600–3,000 ft) but is found at elevations of up to 1,200 m (3,900 ft) in Ecuador and as low as 100 m (330 ft) in Colombia. The average elevation inhabited is highest in the north of the range and is the lowest in the south.

The emerald tanager inhabits humid lowland forest, montane evergreen forest, and secondary forest. It is usually found in the canopy and rarely strays to the forest floor. It has also been observed in lone fruiting trees or shrubs next to forests. It prefers forested habitats to semi-open ones.

== Behavior and ecology ==
The species has a generation length of 3.26 years.

=== Feeding ===
The emerald tanager is omnivorous. It mainly feeds on fruit, supplementing its diet with arthropods, flowers, and flower buds. In Costa Rica, arthropods make up a greater proportion of the diet during the breeding season. The most commonly eaten fruits include those in the genera Miconia, Coussapoa, Cecropia, Ficus, Ilex, Tetrochidium, and Topobea.

The emerald tanager forages singly, in pairs, or small flocks of 3–7 individuals within larger mixed-species flocks consisting of other tanager species, honeycreepers, and warblers. It is active, occasionally moving about excitedly when foraging. Fruits are typically gleaned, while insects are mainly foraged from moss in the crown of trees, with moss occasionally being torn apart during feeding to capture prey. The species has also been observed feeding on a swarm of army ants.

=== Breeding ===
The emerald tanager has varying breeding seasons in different areas, breeding from March to May in Costa Rica and from January to April in Colombia. Nests are made above the ground on moss-covered branches, at heights of 1.5–12 m (4.9–39.4 ft). Nests are cup-shaped and made of moss. Eggs are laid in clutches of two. Breeding pairs have been observed carrying insects and fruit to nests.

== Status ==
The emerald tanager is listed as being of least concern by the International Union for Conservation of Nature (IUCN) on the IUCN Red List due to its sufficiently large range and a lack of significant population decline. However, its population, which is thought to be between 40,000 and 499,999 mature birds, is currently decreasing. The species is threatened by habitat destruction and is already suffering locally due to deforestation. Habitat destruction is an especially acute problem in areas that have steep changes in elevation, as it could lead populations becoming isolated and a reduction in genetic diversity (the variety in a population's genetic characteristics).
