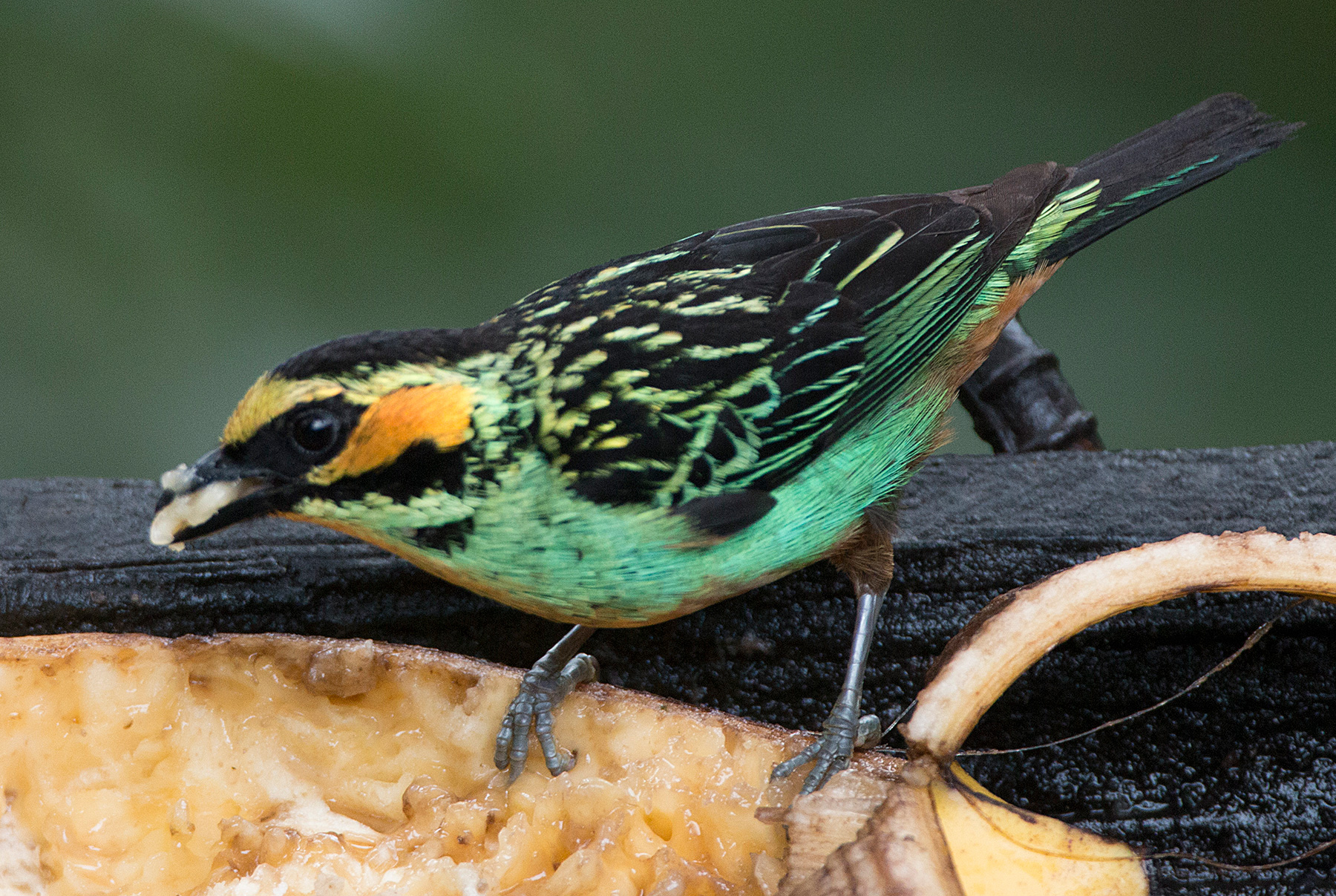

Conservation status
- Least Concern (IUCN 3.1)

Scientific classification
- Kingdom: Animalia
- Phylum: Chordata
- Class: Aves
- Order: Passeriformes
- Family: Thraupidae
- Genus: Tangara
- Species: T. chrysotis

Binomial name
- Tangara chrysotis (Du Bus de Gisignies, 1846)

= Golden-eared tanager =

Species of bird

The golden-eared tanager (Tangara chrysotis) is a species of bird in the tanager family Thraupidae. It is found in the eastern Andes of Bolivia, Colombia, Ecuador and Peru where its natural habitat is subtropical or tropical moist montane forests.

== Taxonomy and systematics ==
The golden-eared tanager was first described as Calliste chrysotis by Bernard du Bus de Gisignies in 1846, on the basis of a specimen collected from Peru. The generic name Tangara comes from the Tupí word tangara, which means dancer. The specific name chrysotis is from the Ancient Greek χρυσος (khrusos), meaning golden, and ωτις (otis), meaning eared. Golden-eared tanager is the official common name designated by the International Ornithologists' Union (IOC). Other names for the species include golden eared tanager.

The golden-eared tanager is one of 27 species in the genus Tangara. Within the genus, it is put in a species group with the blue-whiskered tanager, green-and-gold tanager, emerald tanager, golden tanager, silver-throated tanager, saffron-crowned tanager, and flame-faced tanager. The golden-eared tanager is sister to a clade formed by the rest of the species in this group. This placement has been supported by DNA evidence. It has no subspecies.
