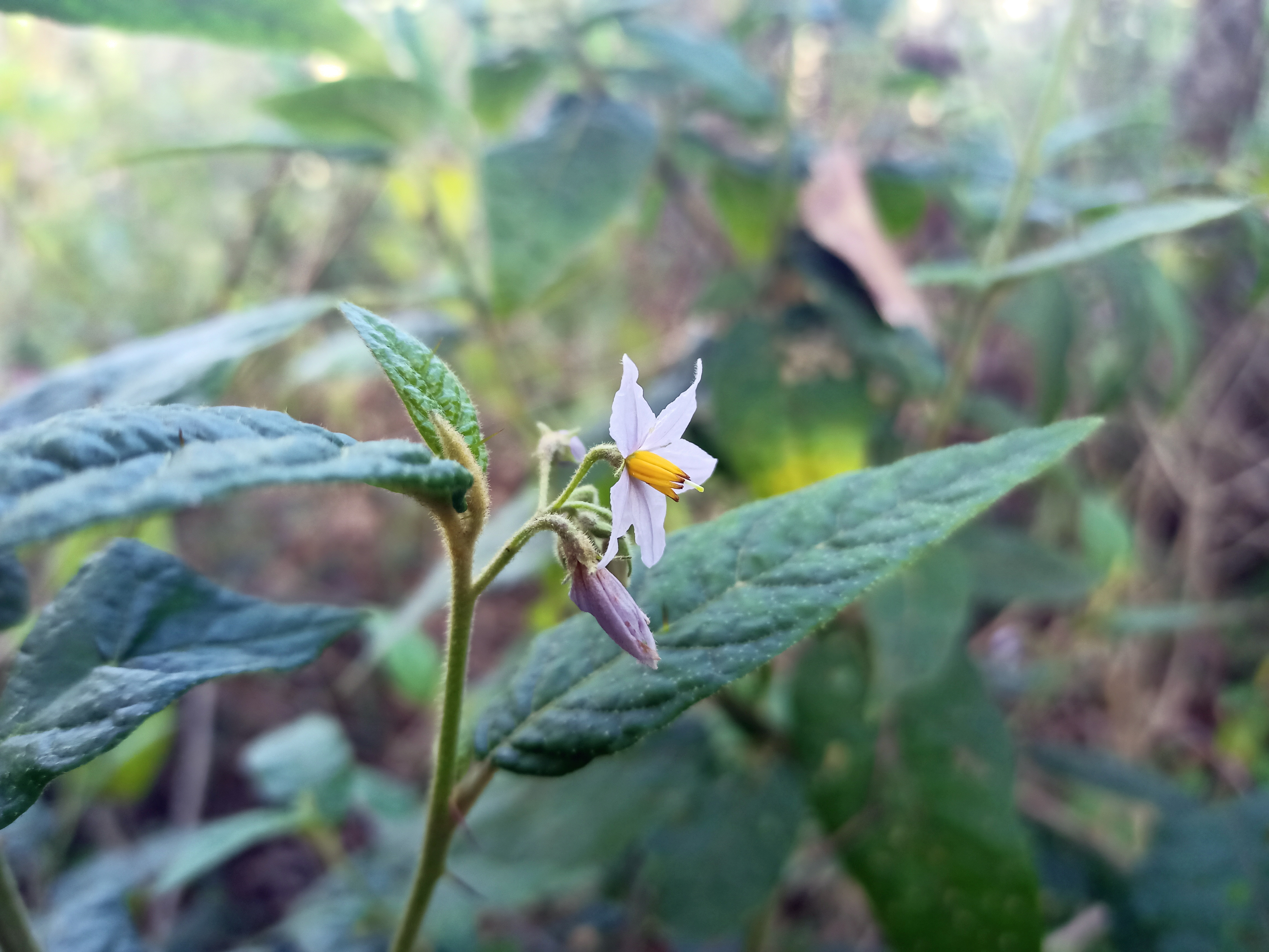
- Flower
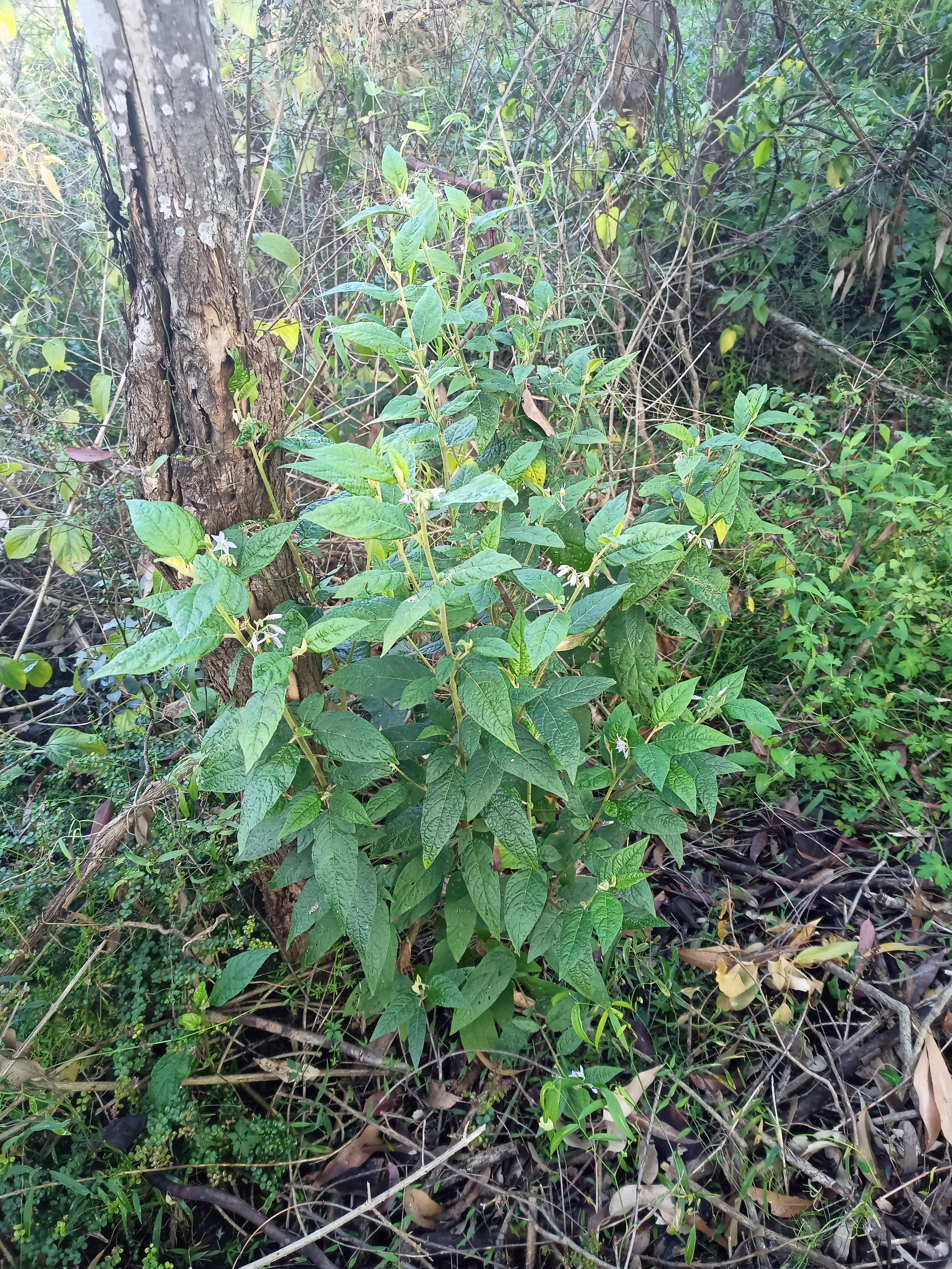
- Habit

Scientific classification
- Kingdom: Plantae
- Clade: Tracheophytes
- Clade: Angiosperms
- Clade: Eudicots
- Clade: Asterids
- Order: Solanales
- Family: Solanaceae
- Genus: Solanum
- Species: S. stelligerum

Binomial name
- Solanum stelligerum Sm.

Synonyms
- Solanum accedens Domin; Solanum lucorum Domin; Solanum stelligerum var. lucorum Benth.; Solanum stelligerum var. magnifolium Benth.; Solanum stelligerum var. procumbens C.T.White; Solanum stelligerum var. stelligerum Sm.

= Solanum stelligerum =

Species of plant

Solanum stelligerum, the star nightshade or devil's needles, is a species of flowering plant in the family Solanaceae, native to eastern Australia. A woody shrub reaching 2 m (7 ft), it is typically found growing on sand dunes, in open Eucalyptus woodlands, and on forest edges. The small red fruit are eaten by Aboriginal Australians, but it is recommended to only consume low quantities.
