= Blakea verrucosa =

Conservation status
- Endangered (IUCN 3.1)

Scientific classification
- Kingdom: Plantae
- Clade: Tracheophytes
- Clade: Angiosperms
- Clade: Eudicots
- Clade: Rosids
- Order: Myrtales
- Family: Melastomataceae
- Genus: Blakea
- Species: B. verrucosa

Binomial name
- Blakea verrucosa (Wurdack) Penneys & Judd

Synonyms
- Topobea verrucosa Wurdack

Species of flowering plant endemic to Ecuador

Blakea verrucosa is a species of plant in the family Melastomataceae. It is endemic to Ecuador.
