= Blakea brevibractea =

Conservation status
- Vulnerable (IUCN 3.1)

Scientific classification
- Kingdom: Plantae
- Clade: Embryophytes
- Clade: Tracheophytes
- Clade: Angiosperms
- Clade: Eudicots
- Clade: Rosids
- Order: Myrtales
- Family: Melastomataceae
- Genus: Blakea
- Species: B. brevibractea

Binomial name
- Blakea brevibractea (Gleason) Penneys & Judd

Synonyms
- Topobea brevibractea Gleason

Species of plant endemic to Ecuador

Blakea brevibractea is a species of plant in the family Melastomataceae. It is endemic to Ecuador.
