= Blakea hispida =

Conservation status
- Vulnerable (IUCN 3.1)

Scientific classification
- Kingdom: Plantae
- Clade: Tracheophytes
- Clade: Angiosperms
- Clade: Eudicots
- Clade: Rosids
- Order: Myrtales
- Family: Melastomataceae
- Genus: Blakea
- Species: B. hispida

Binomial name
- Blakea hispida Markgr.

Synonyms
- Heterotypic Synonyms: Blakea hispida subsp. stenopetala Wurdack

Species of flowering plant

Blakea hispida is a species of flowering plant in the family Melastomataceae. It is native to Colombia, Ecuador, and Peru. Its natural habitats are subtropical or tropical moist lowland forests and subtropical or tropical moist montane forests.
