= Blakea attenboroughii =

Scientific classification
- Kingdom: Plantae
- Clade: Tracheophytes
- Clade: Angiosperms
- Clade: Eudicots
- Clade: Rosids
- Order: Myrtales
- Family: Melastomataceae
- Genus: Blakea
- Species: B. attenboroughii

Binomial name
- Blakea attenboroughii Penneys & L.Jost

Species of flowering plant

Blakea attenboroughii is a species of plant in the genus Blakea. It is endemic to Ecuador and is named after the naturalist and television presenter, David Attenborough.

The species was discovered by Lou Jost, an American botanist, in 2007.

== See also ==
- List of things named after David Attenborough and his works
