= Judd system =

System of plant taxonomy

A 20th-century system of plant taxonomy, the Judd system (1999-2016) of plant classification was drawn up by the American botanist Walter S. Judd (1951-) and collaborators, partially based on APG schemes.

== 2016 system ==
- viridophytes (green plants)
  - chlorophytes
  - streptophytes
    - streptophyte green algae
    - embryophytes (land plants)
      - bryophytes
        - liverworts
        - mosses
        - hornworts
      - tracheophytes (vascular plants)
        - lycophytes
          - Lycopodiales
        - euphyllophytes
          - monilophytes (ferns)
            - Equisetales
            - Psilotales
            - Ophioglossales
            - leptosporangiate ferns
              - Osmundales
              - Salviniales
              - Cyatheales
              - Polypodiales
                - eupolypods I
                - eupolypods II
          - spermatophytes (seed plants)
            - gymnosperms
              - Cycadales (cycads)
              - Ginkgoales
              - Coniferales (conifers)
              - Gnetales
            - angiosperms
              - ANA grade
              - Mesangiospermae
                - magnoliid clade (Magnoliidae)
                - Ceratophyllales
                - monocots (Monocotyledoneae)
                - eudicots (tricolpates; Eudicotyledoneae)

== Bibliography ==
- Judd, W., Campbell, C., Kellog, E., Stevens, P. (1999). Plant systematics: a phylogenetic approach. Sinauer Associates.
- Judd, W., Campbell, C., Kellog, E., Stevens, P. (2002). Plant systematics: a phylogenetic approach. 2nd ed. Sinauer Associates.
- Judd, W., Campbell, C., Kellog, E., Stevens, P., Donoghue, M. (2002). Plant systematics: a phylogenetic approach. 3rd ed. Sinauer Associates. ISBN 0-87893-407-3. Google Books.
- Judd, W., Campbell, C., Kellog, E., Stevens, P., Donoghue, M. (2016). Plant systematics: a phylogenetic approach. 4th ed. Sinauer Associates. ISBN 978-1-60535-389-0. Sinauer website.
