= Blakea asplundii =

Conservation status
- Vulnerable (IUCN 3.1)

Scientific classification
- Kingdom: Plantae
- Clade: Tracheophytes
- Clade: Angiosperms
- Clade: Eudicots
- Clade: Rosids
- Order: Myrtales
- Family: Melastomataceae
- Genus: Blakea
- Species: B. asplundii

Binomial name
- Blakea asplundii (Wurdack) Penneys & Judd

Synonyms
- Topobea asplundii Wurdack

Species of flowering plant

Blakea asplundii is a species of plant in the family Melastomataceae. It is found in Peru and Ecuador.
