= Blakea granatensis =

Conservation status
- Least Concern (IUCN 3.1)

Scientific classification
- Kingdom: Plantae
- Clade: Tracheophytes
- Clade: Angiosperms
- Clade: Eudicots
- Clade: Rosids
- Order: Myrtales
- Family: Melastomataceae
- Genus: Blakea
- Species: B. granatensis

Binomial name
- Blakea granatensis Naudin

Species of flowering plant

Blakea granatensis is a species of plant in the family Melastomataceae. It is endemic to Colombia.
