= Blakea brunnea =

Conservation status
- Endangered (IUCN 2.3)

Scientific classification
- Kingdom: Plantae
- Clade: Tracheophytes
- Clade: Angiosperms
- Clade: Eudicots
- Clade: Rosids
- Order: Myrtales
- Family: Melastomataceae
- Genus: Blakea
- Species: B. brunnea

Binomial name
- Blakea brunnea Gleason

Species of flowering plant

Blakea brunnea is a species of plant in the family Melastomataceae. It is found in Honduras and Panama.
