= Blakea pascoensis =

Conservation status
- Vulnerable (IUCN 2.3)

Scientific classification
- Kingdom: Plantae
- Clade: Embryophytes
- Clade: Tracheophytes
- Clade: Angiosperms
- Clade: Eudicots
- Clade: Rosids
- Order: Myrtales
- Family: Melastomataceae
- Genus: Blakea
- Species: B. pascoensis

Binomial name
- Blakea pascoensis (Wurdack) Penneys & Judd

Synonyms
- Topobea pascoensis Wurdack

Species of plant endemic to Peru

Blakea pascoensis is a species of plant in the family Melastomataceae. It is endemic to Peru.
