= Blakea incompta =

Conservation status
- Endangered (IUCN 3.1)

Scientific classification
- Kingdom: Plantae
- Clade: Tracheophytes
- Clade: Angiosperms
- Clade: Eudicots
- Clade: Rosids
- Order: Myrtales
- Family: Melastomataceae
- Genus: Blakea
- Species: B. incompta

Binomial name
- Blakea incompta Markgr.

Species of flowering plant

Blakea incompta is a species of flowering plant in the family Melastomataceae.

It is endemic to Ecuador. Its natural habitat is subtropical or tropical moist montane forests.
