= Blakea parvifolia =

Conservation status
- Data Deficient (IUCN 2.3)

Scientific classification
- Kingdom: Plantae
- Clade: Embryophytes
- Clade: Tracheophytes
- Clade: Angiosperms
- Clade: Eudicots
- Clade: Rosids
- Order: Myrtales
- Family: Melastomataceae
- Genus: Blakea
- Species: B. parvifolia

Binomial name
- Blakea parvifolia Gleason

Synonyms
- Topobea parvifolia (Gleason) Almeda

Species of plant found in Peru and Panama

Blakea parvifolia is a species of plant in the family Melastomataceae. It is found in Panama and Peru.
