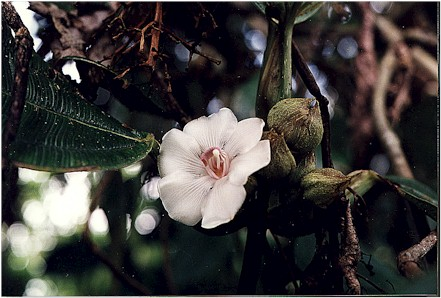
- Blakea eriocalyx

Scientific classification
- Kingdom: Plantae
- Clade: Tracheophytes
- Clade: Angiosperms
- Clade: Eudicots
- Clade: Rosids
- Order: Myrtales
- Family: Melastomataceae
- Genus: Blakea; P.Browne

= Blakea =

Genus of flowering plants

Blakea is a genus of flowering plants in the family Melastomataceae. There are about 189 species distributed from Mexico to Bolivia and the Antilles. They are climbers, shrubs, and trees, some epiphytic. One species from the cloud forests of Costa Rica is pollinated by rice rats.

Species, accepted as of March 2021, include:

- Blakea acostae Wurdack
- Blakea acuminata (Wurdack) Penneys & Judd
- Blakea adscendens (E.Cotton & Matezki) Penneys & Judd
- Blakea aeruginosa Standl.
- Blakea albertiae (Wurdack) Penneys & Almeda
- Blakea allotricha L.Uribe
- Blakea alternifolia Gleason
- Blakea amabilis Cogn.
- Blakea amplifolia (Almeda) Penneys & Almeda
- Blakea andreana Cogn.
- Blakea anomala Donn.Sm.
- Blakea arboricola (Almeda) Penneys & Almeda
- Blakea argentea Gleason
- Blakea asplundii (Wurdack) Penneys & Judd
- Blakea attenboroughii Penneys, named after the naturalist and television presenter David Attenborough[1]
- Blakea austin-smithii Standl.
- Blakea barbata (Gleason) Penneys & Judd
- Blakea bocatorena Kriebel & D.Santam.
- Blakea brachyura Gleason
- Blakea bracteata Gleason
- Blakea brasiliensis Cogn.
- Blakea brenesii (Standl.) Penneys & Almeda
- Blakea brevibractea (Gleason) Penneys & Judd
- Blakea brunnea Gleason
- Blakea bullata (E.Cotton & Matezki) Penneys & Judd
- Blakea calcarata (L.Uribe & Matezki) Penneys & Judd
- Blakea calophylla (Almeda) Penneys & Almeda
- Blakea calycosa Gleason
- Blakea calycularis (Naudin) Penneys & Almeda
- Blakea calyptrata Gleason
- Blakea campii Wurdack
- Blakea castanedae (Wurdack) Penneys & Judd
- Blakea chlorantha Almeda
- Blakea ciliata Markgr.
- Blakea clavata Penneys & Judd
- Blakea clusiifolia Gleason
- Blakea coloradensis Almeda
- Blakea cordata (Gleason) Penneys & Almeda
- Blakea costaricensis Umaña & Almeda
- Blakea crassifolia Almeda
- Blakea crinita Gleason
- Blakea cuatrecasasii Gleason
- Blakea cuneata Standl.
- Blakea cuprina Penneys & Judd
- Blakea cutucuensis (Wurdack) Penneys & Judd
- Blakea darcyana Almeda
- Blakea dimorphophylla (Almeda) Penneys & Almeda
- Blakea discolor (Hochr.) Penneys & Judd
- Blakea dodsonorum (Wurdack) Penneys & Almeda
- Blakea droseropila Penneys
- Blakea durandiana Cogn. ex T.Durand & Pittier
- Blakea echinata Almeda & Penneys
- Blakea elliptica (Gleason) Almeda
- Blakea eplingii (Wurdack) Penneys & Judd
- Blakea eriocalyx Wurdack
- Blakea fasciculata Gleason
- Blakea ferruginea (Gleason) Penneys & Judd
- Blakea fissicalyx L.Uribe
- Blakea florifera Gleason
- Blakea foliacea Gleason
- Blakea formicaria Wurdack
- Blakea fragrantissima (Almeda) Penneys & Almeda
- Blakea fuchsioides Almeda
- Blakea gerardoana (Almeda) Penneys & Almeda
- Blakea glaberrima (Triana) Penneys & Judd
- Blakea glabrescens Benth.
- Blakea glandulosa Gleason
- Blakea gracilis Hemsl.
- Blakea granatensis Naudin
- Blakea grandiflora Hemsl.
- Blakea gregii Almeda
- Blakea grisebachii Cogn.
- Blakea guatemalensis Donn.Sm.
- Blakea hammelii Almeda
- Blakea hammettiorum Almeda
- Blakea harlingii Wurdack
- Blakea henripittieri (Cogn.) Penneys & Almeda
- Blakea herrerae Almeda
- Blakea hexandra (Almeda) Penneys & Almeda
- Blakea hirsuta O.Berg ex Triana
- Blakea hirsutissima (J.F.Macbr.) Wurdack
- Blakea hispida Markgr.
- Blakea holtonii Hochr.
- Blakea horologica Penneys & Judd
- Blakea hydraeformis Wurdack
- Blakea incompta Markgr.
- Blakea induta (Markgr.) Penneys & Judd
- Blakea inflata (Triana) Penneys & Judd
- Blakea insignis (Triana) Penneys & Judd
- Blakea intricata (Almeda) Penneys & Almeda
- Blakea involvens Markgr.
- Blakea jativae Wurdack
- Blakea killipii (Wurdack) Penneys & Judd
- Blakea laevigata D.Don
- Blakea lanuginosa Wurdack
- Blakea latifolia D.Don
- Blakea lentii (Almeda) Penneys & Almeda
- Blakea lindeniana Triana
- Blakea litoralis L.O.Williams
- Blakea longibracteata Cogn.
- Blakea longiloba (Wurdack) Penneys & Judd
- Blakea longipes L.Uribe
- Blakea longisepala (Gleason) Penneys & Judd
- Blakea macbrydei (Wurdack) Penneys & Judd
- Blakea madisonii Wurdack
- Blakea maguirei (Wurdack) Penneys & Judd
- Blakea maurofernandeziana (Cogn.) Penneys & Almeda
- Blakea mcphersonii (Almeda) Penneys & Almeda
- Blakea megaphylla Wurdack
- Blakea mexiae Gleason
- Blakea micrantha Almeda
- Blakea modica (Wurdack) Penneys & Judd
- Blakea monticola J.R.Johnst.
- Blakea mortoniana (Wurdack) Penneys & Judd
- Blakea multiflora D.Don
- Blakea muricata (Lozano) Penneys & Judd
- Blakea nangaritzana D.Fernández, C.Ulloa & Penneys
- Blakea nareliana Bussmann
- Blakea nodosa Wurdack
- Blakea oldemanii Wurdack
- Blakea orientalis Gleason
- Blakea ovalis D.Don
- Blakea paleacea Gleason
- Blakea paludosa Gleason
- Blakea parasitica (Aubl.) D.Don
- Blakea parvifolia Gleason
- Blakea pascoensis (Wurdack) Penneys & Judd
- Blakea pauciflora Gleason
- Blakea pectinata Penneys
- Blakea penduliflora Almeda
- Blakea perforata Almeda
- Blakea pichinchensis Wurdack
- Blakea pilosa Gleason
- Blakea platypoda Gleason
- Blakea pluvialis (Standl.) Penneys & Almeda
- Blakea podagrica Triana
- Blakea polyantha Wurdack
- Blakea portentosa Wurdack
- Blakea princeps Cogn.
- Blakea pulverulenta Vahl
- Blakea punctulata (Triana) Wurdack
- Blakea purpusii Brandegee
- Blakea pyxidanthus Triana
- Blakea quadrangularis Triana
- Blakea quadriflora Gleason
- Blakea repens D.Don
- Blakea rosea D.Don
- Blakea rostrata O.Berg ex Triana
- Blakea rotundifolia D.Don
- Blakea sawadae J.F.Macbr.
- Blakea scarlatina Almeda
- Blakea schlimii (Naudin) Triana
- Blakea schultzei Markgr.
- Blakea sessilifolia (Triana) Penneys & Judd
- Blakea setosa (Triana) Penneys & Judd
- Blakea spruceana Cogn.
- Blakea squamigera L.Uribe
- Blakea standleyana J.F.Macbr.
- Blakea standleyi (L.O.Williams) Penneys & Almeda
- Blakea stellaris Gleason
- Blakea stephanochaeta (Naudin) Penneys & Judd
- Blakea steyermarkii (Wurdack) Penneys & Judd
- Blakea stipulacea Wurdack
- Blakea storkii (Standl.) Almeda
- Blakea suaveolens (Almeda) Penneys & Almeda
- Blakea subbarbata (Wurdack) Penneys & Judd
- Blakea subconnata O.Berg ex Triana
- Blakea subpanduriformis E.Cotton & Matezki
- Blakea subscabrula (Triana) Penneys & Judd
- Blakea subsessiliflora (Wurdack) Penneys & Judd
- Blakea subvaginata Wurdack
- Blakea superba (Naudin) Penneys & Judd
- Blakea tapantiana Umaña & Almeda
- Blakea tetramera (Almeda) Penneys & Almeda
- Blakea tetroici (Wurdack) Penneys & Judd
- Blakea toachiensis (Wurdack) Penneys & Judd
- Blakea trianae (Cogn.) Penneys & Judd
- Blakea trinervia L.
- Blakea truncata Gleason
- Blakea tuberculata Donn.Sm.
- Blakea unguiculata Almeda & Penneys
- Blakea urbaniana Cogn.
- Blakea vallensis Wurdack
- Blakea venusta Kriebel, Almeda & A.Estrada
- Blakea verrucosa (Wurdack) Penneys & Judd
- Blakea villosa Cogn.
- Blakea watsonii (Cogn.) Penneys & Almeda
- Blakea wilburiana Almeda
- Blakea wilsoniorum Almeda
