= Woodland edge =

Transition zone from an area of woodland or forest to fields or other open spaces

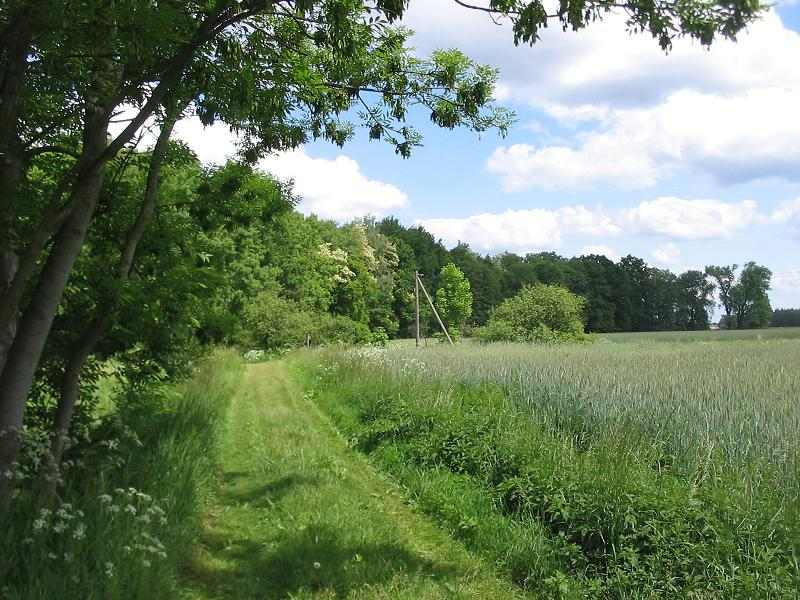
Woodland edge in Brandenburg

A woodland edge or forest edge is the transition zone (ecotone) from an area of woodland or forest to fields or other open spaces. Certain species of plants and animals are adapted to the forest edge, and these species are often more familiar to humans than species only found deeper within forests. A classic example of a forest edge species is the white-tailed deer in North America.

== The woodland edge on maps ==
On topographic maps woods and forests are generally depicted in a soft green colour. Their edges are – like other features – usually determined from aerial photographs, but sometimes also by terrestrial survey. However, they only represent a snapshot in time because almost all woods have a tendency to spread or to gradually fill clearings. In addition, working out the exact edge of the wood or forest may be difficult where it transitions into scrub or bushes or the trees thin out slowly. Differences of opinion here often involved several tens of metres. In addition, many cartographers prefer to show even small islands of trees, while others – depending on the scale of the map – prefer more general, continuous lines to demarcate the forest or woodland edges.

For specialised work, aerial photographs or satellite imagery are frequently utilised without having to revise the maps. Cadastral maps cannot show the current situation because for reasons of cost they can only be updated at fairly long intervals and cultural boundaries are not legally binding.

== Woodland edges and biology ==
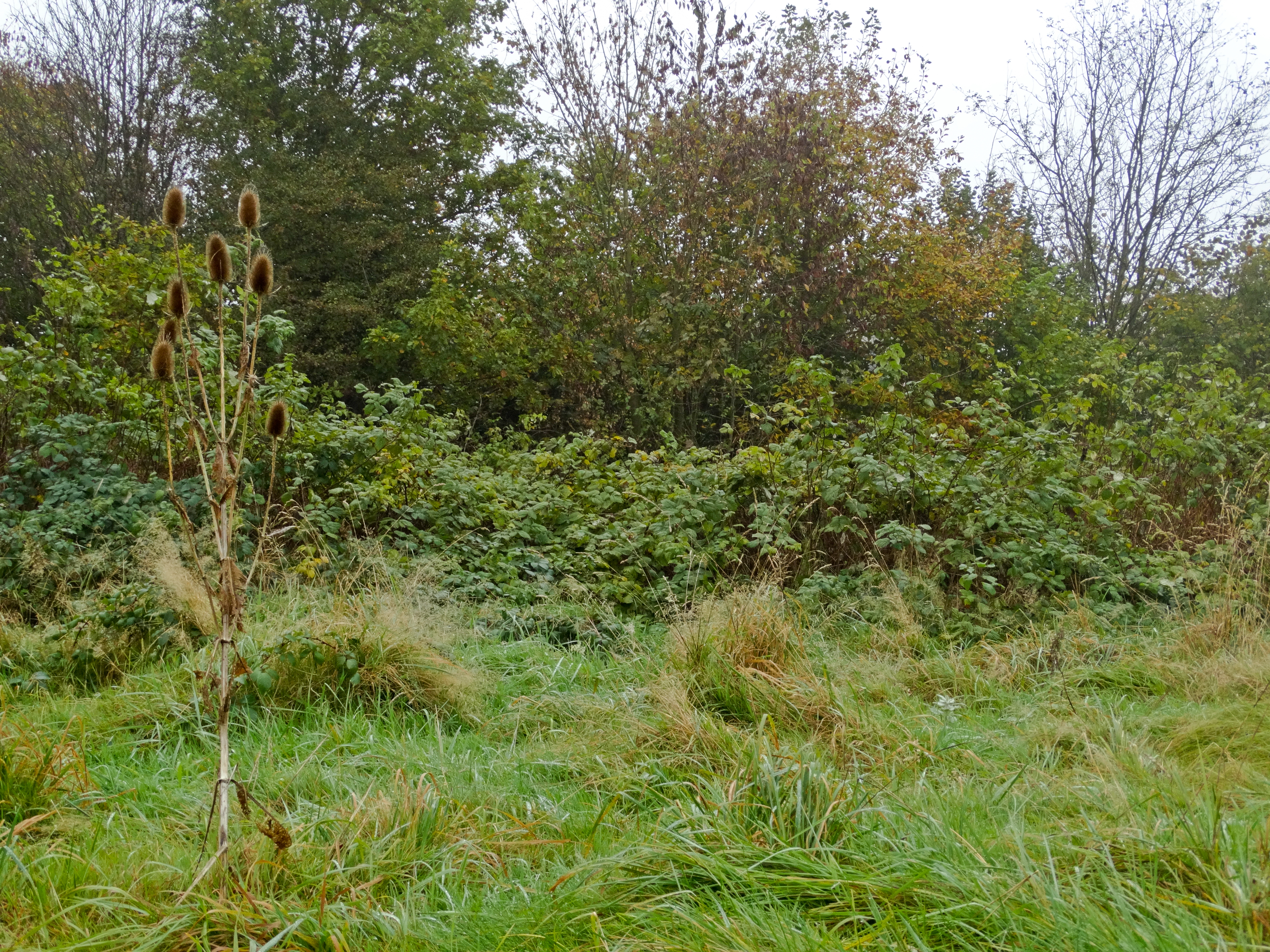
Natural woodland edge development through succession of an abandoned meadow

On the woodland edge – however it is defined – not only does the flora change, but also the fauna and the soil type. These edge effects mean that many species of animal prefer woodland edges to the heart of the forest, because they have both protection and light – for example, tree pipits and dunnocks. At the woodland edge trees are often different from those inside the wood, as well as hedge vegetation, brambles and low-growing plants. The more gradual the transition from open country to woodland (for example, through intermediate young trees or bushes), the less risk there is that, in stormy weather, wind will blow under the canopy and uproot the outer rows of trees. The structure of the woodland edge and its maintenance is viewed as important in forest management especially during reforestation.

Hunters also use the forest edge for the observation and hunting of wildlife, for example, by using tree stands or hides.

== See also ==
- Edge effects

== Literature ==
- Thomas Coch, Hermann Hondong: Waldrandpflege. Grundlagen und Konzepte. 21 Tabellen. "Praktischer Naturschutz" series. Neumann, Radebeul, 1995, ISBN 3-7402-0150-9
- Beinlich, B., Gockel, H. A. & Grawe, F. (2014): Mittelwaldähnliche Waldrandgestaltung – Ökonomie und Ökologie im Einklang. – ANLiegen Natur 36(1): 61–65, Laufen. PDF 0.7 MB.
