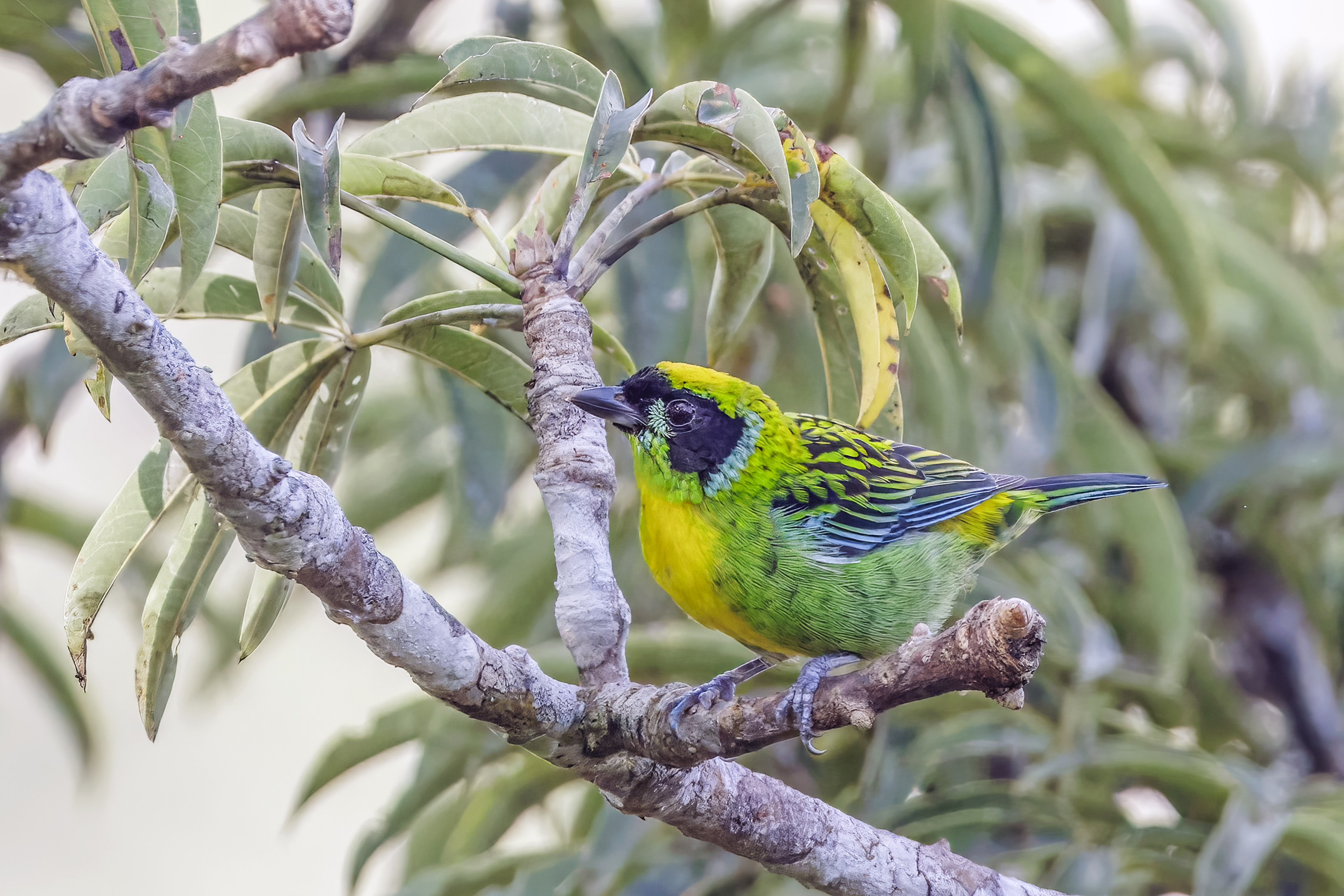
- Tangara schrankii schrankii, Ecuador

Conservation status
- Least Concern (IUCN 3.1)

Scientific classification
- Kingdom: Animalia
- Phylum: Chordata
- Class: Aves
- Order: Passeriformes
- Family: Thraupidae
- Genus: Tangara
- Species: T. schrankii

Binomial name
- Tangara schrankii (Spix, 1825)

= Green-and-gold tanager =

Species of bird

The green-and-gold tanager (Tangara schrankii) is a species of bird in the family Thraupidae, the tanagers. It is one of 27 species in the genus Tangara.

It is found in the western and central Amazon Basin in eastern Venezuela, Colombia, Ecuador, Peru, central Bolivia, and northwestern Brazil. Its natural habitats are subtropical or tropical moist lowland forests and subtropical or tropical swamps.

== Distribution ==
The green-and-gold tanager's range is almost all of the western Amazon basin to the higher elevation mountain foothills of the eastern Andes. The contiguous range has three extensions. A southerly extension from southern Peru into central Bolivia is about 2000 km long and 400 km wide, and in Bolivia covers the upper reaches of tributary rivers to the northeast flowing Madeira River. A 1300 km range extension goes north to the southeastern Venezuela higher elevation border region, from the Rio Negro of the Amazon, beyond the upper reaches of Venezuela's Caribbean north-flowing Orinoco River. The third easterly extension goes in the central basin and ends at only the middle reaches of the northerly flowing Tapajós River, a stretch of 800 km of the 3000 km long river.
