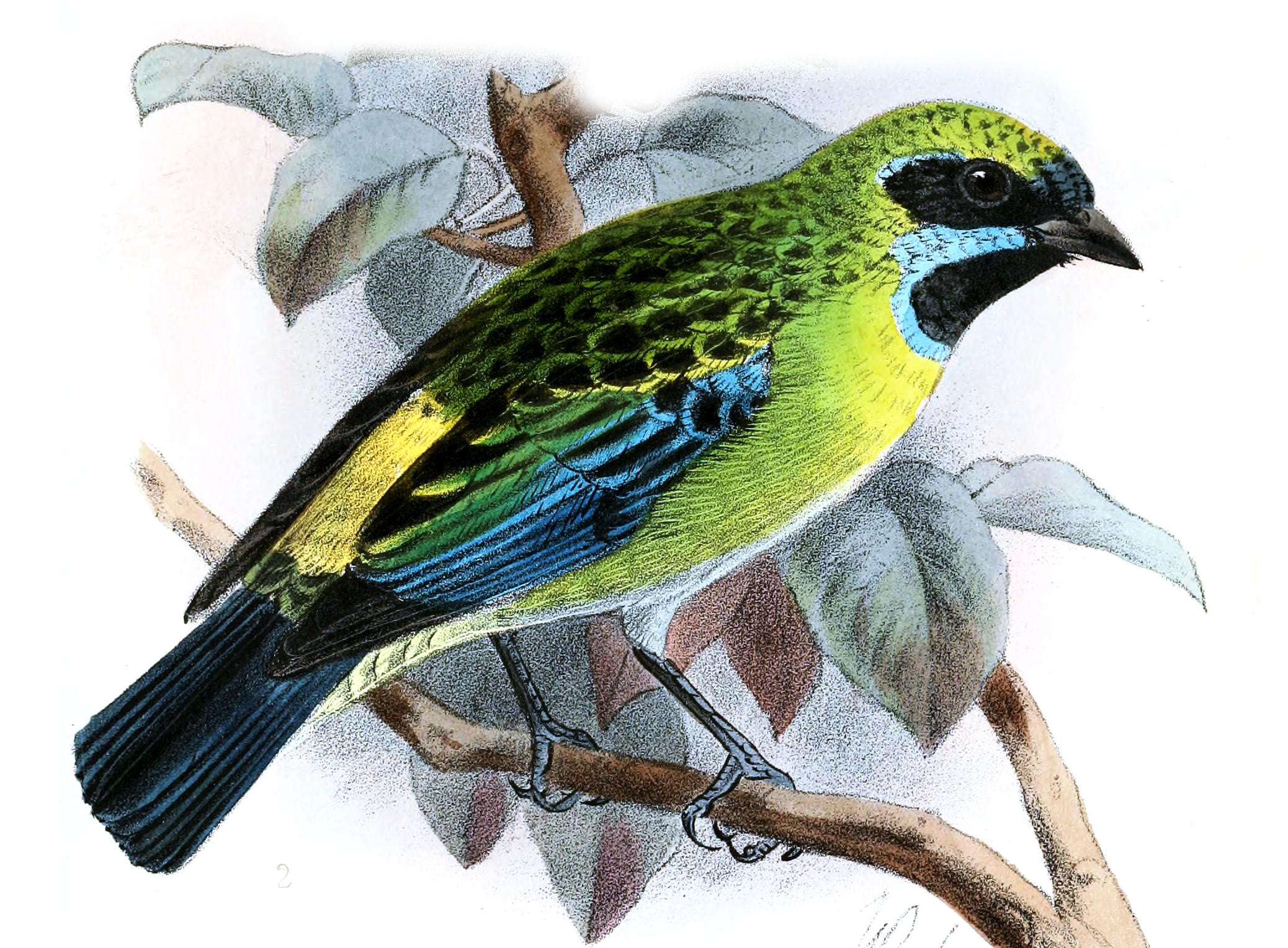

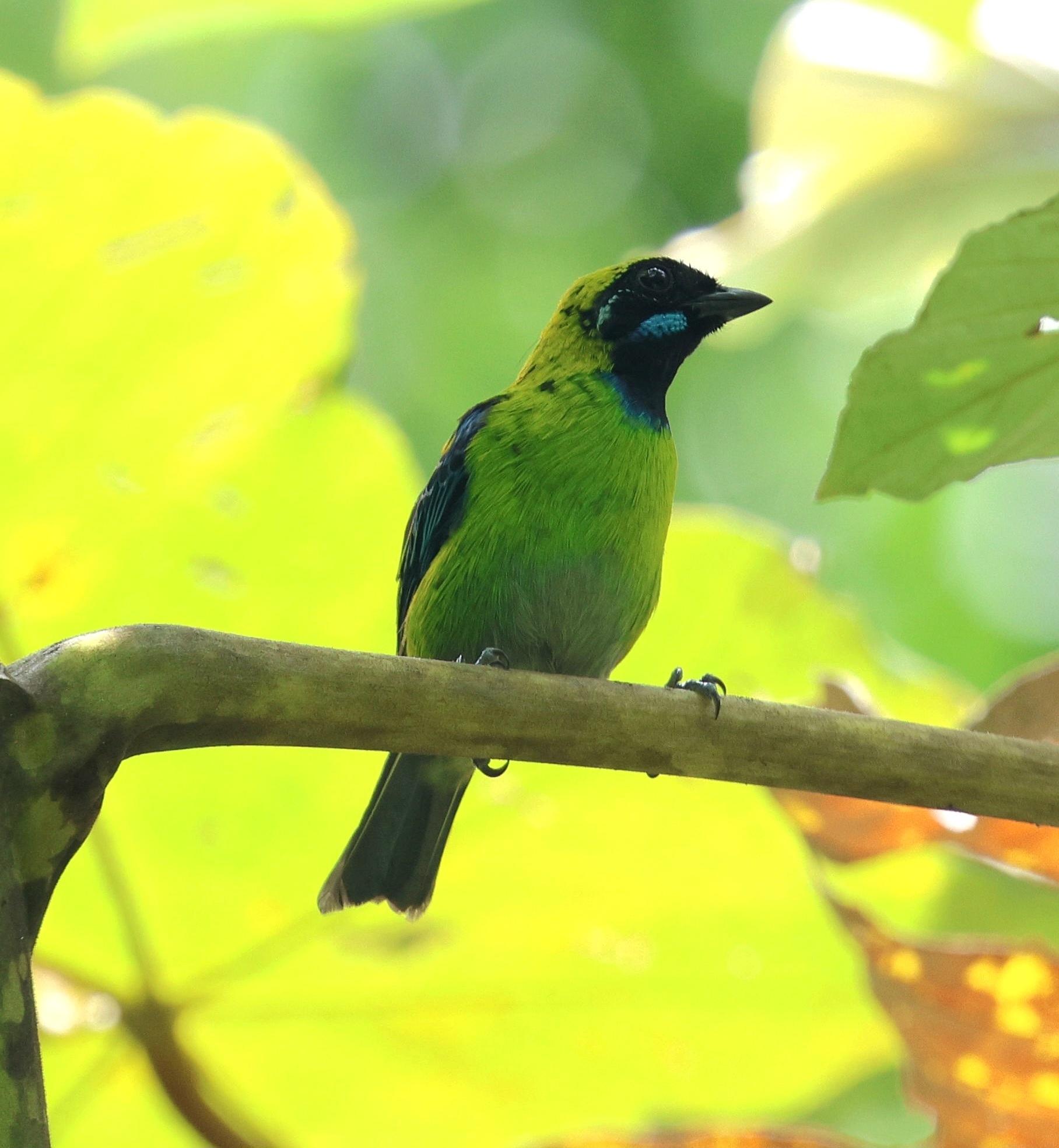

Conservation status
- Least Concern (IUCN 3.1)

Scientific classification
- Kingdom: Animalia
- Phylum: Chordata
- Class: Aves
- Order: Passeriformes
- Family: Thraupidae
- Genus: Tangara
- Species: T. johannae

Binomial name
- Tangara johannae (Dalmas, 1900)

Synonyms
- Calliste johannae (protonym)

= Blue-whiskered tanager =

Species of bird

The blue-whiskered tanager (Tangara johannae) is a species of bird in the family Thraupidae. It is found in the Chocó of Colombia and Ecuador. Its natural habitat is subtropical or tropical moist lowland forests. It is threatened by habitat loss.
