= Walter Stephen Judd =

American botanist and taxonomist (born 1951)

- Born: 1951 (age 74–75); Fairbanks, Alaska
- Died: January 4, 2026
- Education: Michigan State University, Harvard University
- Known for: Plant taxonomy (Judd system)
- Spouse: Beverly
- Scientific career
- Fields: Botany
- Workplaces: University of Florida
- Author abbrev. (botany): Judd

Walter S. Judd (born 1951) was an American botanist and taxonomist, and distinguished professor in the Department of Botany, University of Florida beginning in 2009. Judd was born in Fairbanks, Alaska; his family relocated to Shiawassee CO, Michigan. Due to the rural setting, it inspired him to study natural history, botany, plant taxonomy and systematics, and phylogenetics.

== Career ==
Judd attended Michigan State University (B.S. 1973, M.S. 1974) and Harvard University (Ph.D. 1978). He became an assistant professor in the Department of Botany at the University of Florida (1978–1983), associate professor (1983–1991) and professor in 1991. He was president of the American Society of Plant Taxonomists 2000–2001. Judd earned many awards throughout his career, including the Asa Gray Award in 2011.

== Contributions ==
Professor Judd was a contributor to the Angiosperm Phylogeny Group (APG) and produced his own modification of this in 1999, the Judd system. The Judd system was revolutionary and allowed for finer methods of classifying angiosperms. The APG is composed of researchers who research and revise APG classification and have released four revisions consecutively. The Judd system was introduced in APG I (1998) and would pave the way for further developments of the following APGs.

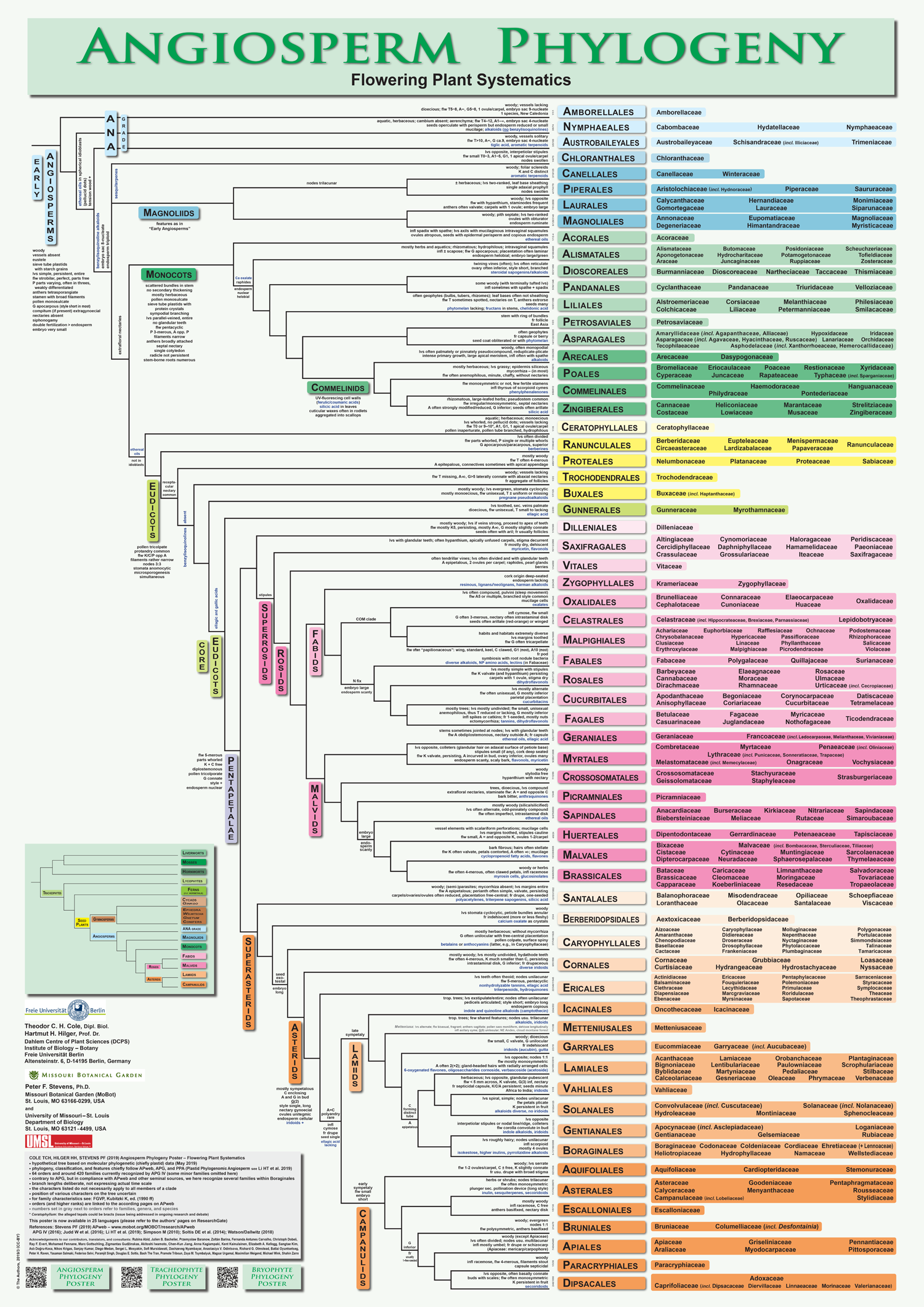
Angiosperm phylogeny and classification chart found in Overview of angiosperm phylogeny. Digital Encyclopedia of Ancient Life. Original: https://doi.org/10.7287/peerj.preprints.2320v6

APG I was an essential collaboration effort between researchers and was managed based on communication. APG II (2003) and APG III (2009) differed from their original. APG II was centered on the “bracketed” system and APG III was centered on the opposite and its focus was not as narrow as its predecessor. However, Christenhusz et al (2015) wrote that family circumscriptions and the impact of DNA-based classification was affecting the APGs. Due to the introduction of DNA into classification, a new system needed to be created. The number of individuals involved increased and soon, the APG system dominated the botany world. It also overtook the Linnaeus classification system and APG IV was released in 2016.

While APG IV lacks focus on extinct groups of angiosperm, it does include a diverse mix of angiosperm that dates from the fossil record. About eight phylogeny families are included in APG IV with a diversity of 295,000 plants. The classification in APG III is different from that of APG IV but there weren’t a lot of changes made to them both. Due to how extensive APG III is, not much is needed to change in APG IV. But as the world of phylogeny continues to expand, there will come a time for changes to the APG system.

In 2001, Peter F. Stevens, a member of the APG published the “Angiosperm Phylogeny Website”, which still receives updates. It was last updated on June 6, 2025, and is an extensive resource for angiosperm classification and includes citations from Judd’s work. The website interlinks systematics and phylogeny, two essential principles in the study of angiosperm classification. Phylogeny allows researchers to push the limits of systematics to warrant further developments of evolution and diversification.

== Awards ==
- American Society of Plant Taxonomists: Asa Gray Award 2011
- National Museum of Natural History: José Cuatrecasas Medal for Excellence in Tropical Botany 2012.

== Publications ==
- Judd, Walter S. (1999–2008). Plant systematics: a phylogenetic approach. 3rd ed. Sinauer Associates. ISBN 0-87893-407-3.
- Judd, Walter S.& Graham A. (2017). Flora of Middle-Earth: Plants of J.R.R. Tolkien's Legendarium. Oxford University Press. ISBN 9780190276317. (see Illustrating Tolkien)

== Sources ==
- JSTOR: Global Plants
- Harvard Botanist Index
