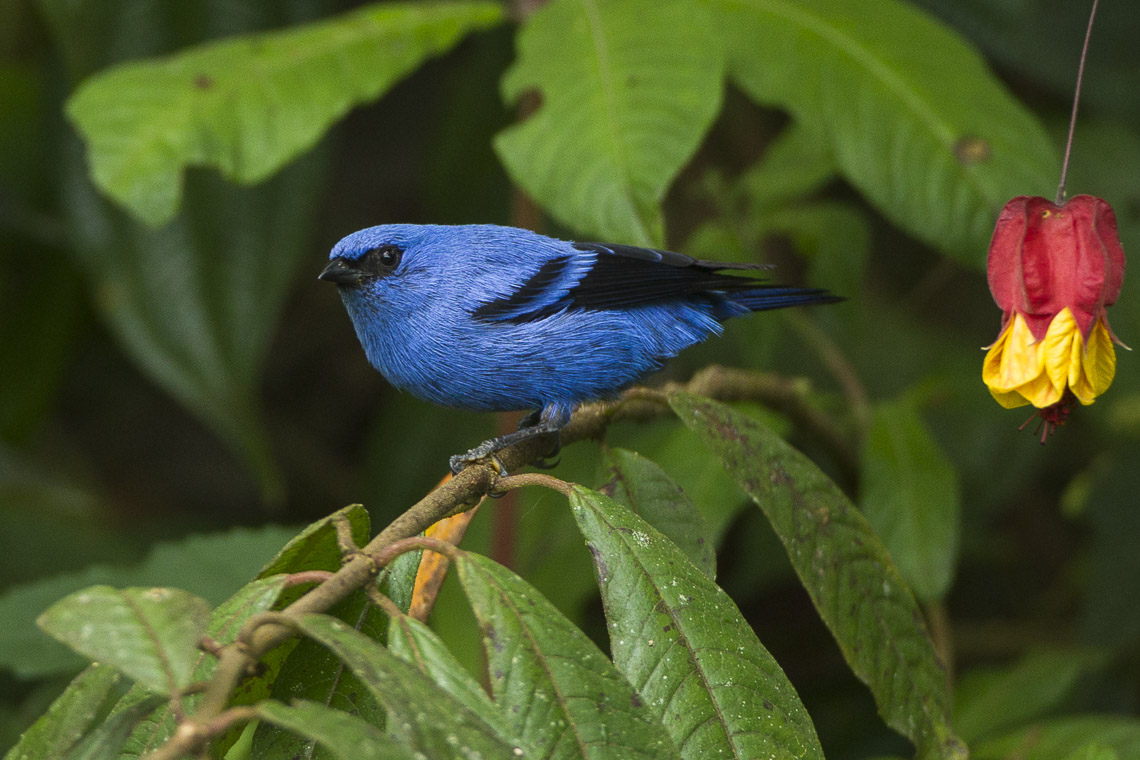

Conservation status
- Least Concern (IUCN 3.1)

Scientific classification
- Kingdom: Animalia
- Phylum: Chordata
- Class: Aves
- Order: Passeriformes
- Family: Thraupidae
- Genus: Tangara
- Species: T. vassorii

Binomial name
- Tangara vassorii (Boissonneau, 1840)

Audio

= Blue-and-black tanager =

Species of bird from South America

The blue-and-black tanager (Tangara vassorii) is a species of bird in the tanager family Thraupidae. It is found in the Andes of Bolivia, Colombia, Ecuador, Peru and Venezuela, where it inhabits montane evergreen forest, dwarf forest, and secondary forest at elevations of 1,500–3,500 m (4,900–11,500 ft). It inhabits the highest altitude of any Tangara species, and is the only species from the genus that is found near the tree line. Adults are 13 cm (5.1 in) long and weigh 18 g (0.63 oz) on average, and are mostly blue with black masks, wings, and tails. The species shows slight sexual dimorphism, with females being slightly duller than males.

The blue-and-black tanager feeds on fruit and arthropods, with the most favored fruit being Miconia. It forages in mixed-species flocks in pairs or groups of 3–6 individuals, especially with Iridosornis or Anisognathus. It breeds from February to August, making cup nests out of moss and rootlets. Begging young have been reported in January, while fledglings have been reported in May. The blue-and-black tanager is listed as being of least concern by the International Union for Conservation of Nature (IUCN) on the IUCN Red List due to its large range, relative commonness, and lack of significant population declines, but is threatened by habitat destruction.

== Taxonomy and systematics ==
The blue-and-black tanager was first described as Tanagra (Euphone?) vassorii by Auguste Boissonneau in 1840. The generic name Tangara comes from the Tupí word tangara, meaning dancer. The specific name vassorii is in honor of the French collector M. Vassor. Blue-and-black tanager is the official common name designated by the International Ornithologists' Union. Other names for the species include "blue and black tanager" and "blue-black tanager".

The blue-and-black tanager is one of 27 species in the genus Tangara. Within the genus, it is part of a species group with the spangle-cheeked tanager, green-naped tanager, and beryl-spangled tanager. In the group, it is sister to the clade formed by the other three species. This placement is supported by mitochondrial DNA evidence.

=== Subspecies ===
There are three recognized subspecies of the blue-and-black tanager. The subspecies are differentiated mostly by differences in plumage.

- Tangara vassorii vassorii (Boissonneau, 1840): The nominate subspecies. It is found from southern Venezuela to northern Peru.
- Tangara vassorii branickii (Taczanowski, 1882): found from the Andes of northern Peru to southern Amazonas and La Libertad. It is similar to the nominate, but has a dull bluish green top and side of head, tinged with gray.
- Tangara vassorii atrocoerulea (Tschudi, 1844): Also known as the spot-bellied tanager, found from central Peru to Bolivia. It can be distinguished by its lighter shade of blue, a yellowish, sometimes white, spot on the nape, and black streaking along its breast. It is considered to be a separate species by some authorities.

== Description ==
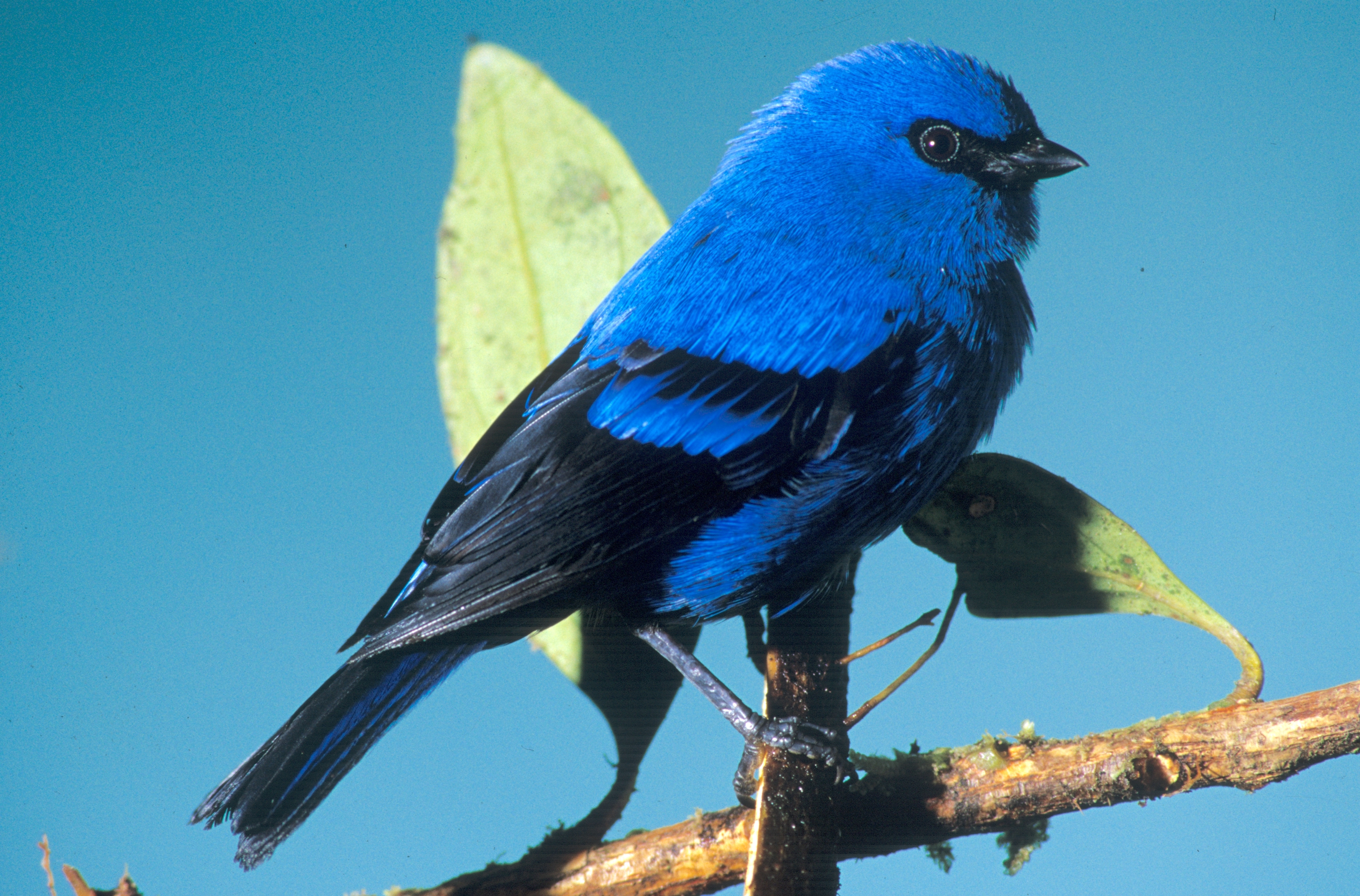
A blue-and-black tanager from Ecuador

The blue-and-black tanager is an average-sized species for its genus, with a mean length of 13 cm (5.1 in) and mass of 18 g (0.63 oz). It shows slight sexual dimorphism, with females being slightly duller than males. Adult males are mainly cobalt blue with a black mask. The wing and tail feathers are black with blue edges. Subadults are mostly gray, but have black wings, tails, and lores. The bill is very short compared to other species of Tangara. The iris is brown, the bill is black, and the feet are wine gray.

The blue-and black tanager may be confused with the masked flowerpiercer, but can be distinguished its brown eye, more extensive black on the wing, and shorter and thicker bill. Populations of the subspecies atrocoerulea may also be confused with the golden-naped tanager, but can be distinguished by their blacker back and lack of cinnamon underparts.

=== Vocalizations ===
The blue-and-black tanager's calls include a thin, high-pitched tsit, a slightly lower swit, a repeated swit-swit-swit, and a hard SWIT-it. The song is 2–3 second long series of rhythmic, high-pitched notes that begin slow and then speed up into a zieeu-zie-zie-zizizizee trill, given every 15 seconds.

== Distribution and habitat ==
The blue-and-black tanager is found in Bolivia, Colombia, Ecuador, Peru and Venezuela in the northern and central Andes, at elevations of 1,500–3,500 m (4,900–11,500 ft). It inhabits the highest altitude of any Tangara species, and is the only species from the genus that is found near the tree line. It mostly inhabits montane evergreen forest, dwarf forest, and secondary forest. It also inhabits forest edges, vegetation in clearings, and patches of growth near the tree line. It generally stays in the canopy.

== Behavior and ecology ==
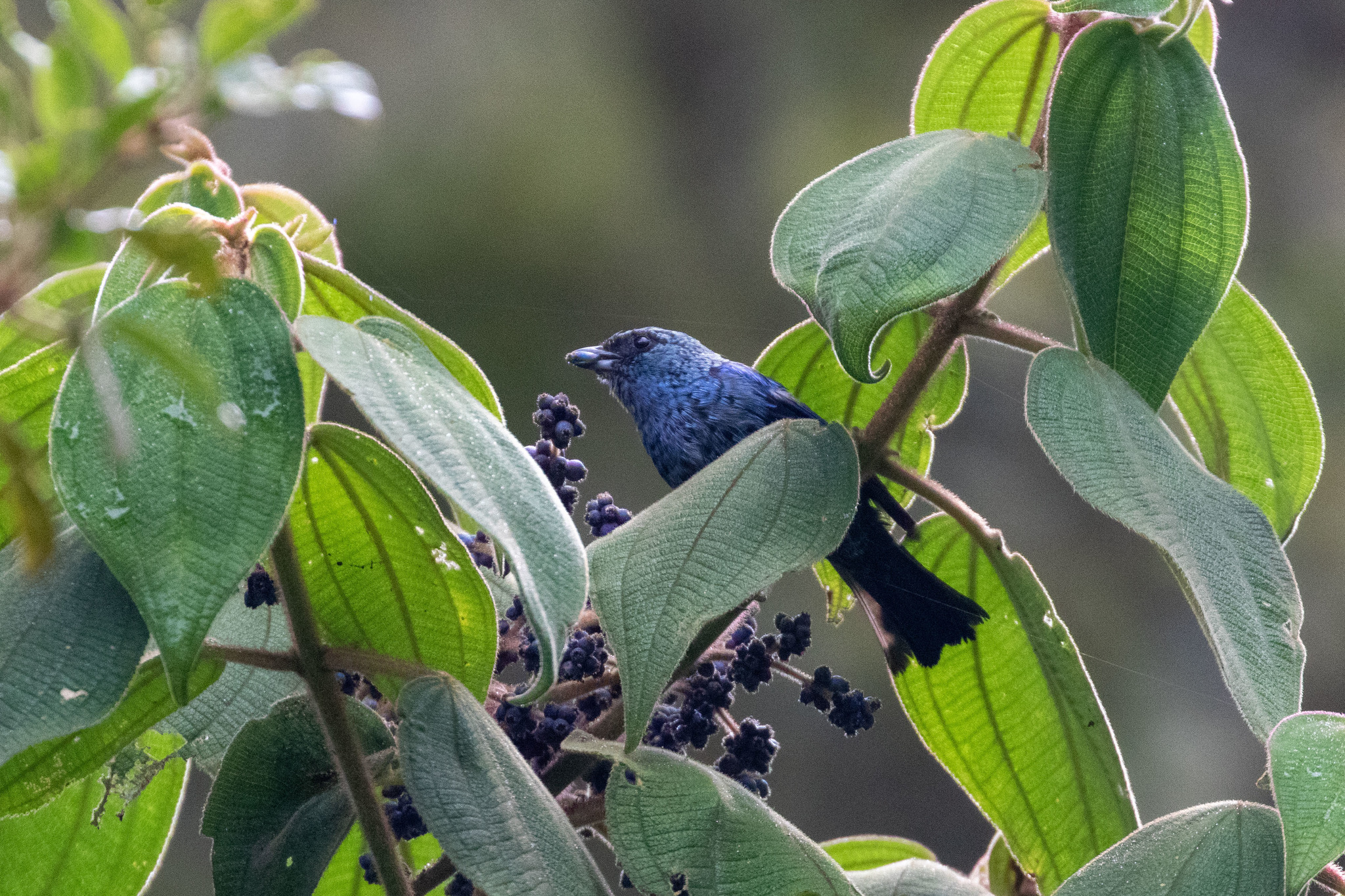
Feeding on fruit

The blue-and-black tanager joins large mixed-species flocks while foraging, most often in pairs or groups of 3–6 individuals. Mixed-species flocks can contain up 15 blue-and-black tanagers, and they have been reported as being the nuclear species (species that helps form and maintain a mixed-species flock) in Colombia. It is found more often with Iridosornis or Anisognathus species than other Tangara.

=== Diet ===
The blue-and-black tanager feeds on fruit and arthropods, especially fruit from plants in the genus Miconia. It is an active forager that moves through foliage constantly. It forages in all strata, but favors the canopy. Foraging for arthropods occurs by hopping on moss-covered branches and inspecting areas such as the undersides of branches, leaves, moss, and small bromeliads. The species feeds on fruit by reaching out and grabbing them quickly, after which they feed on them while sitting upright.

=== Breeding ===
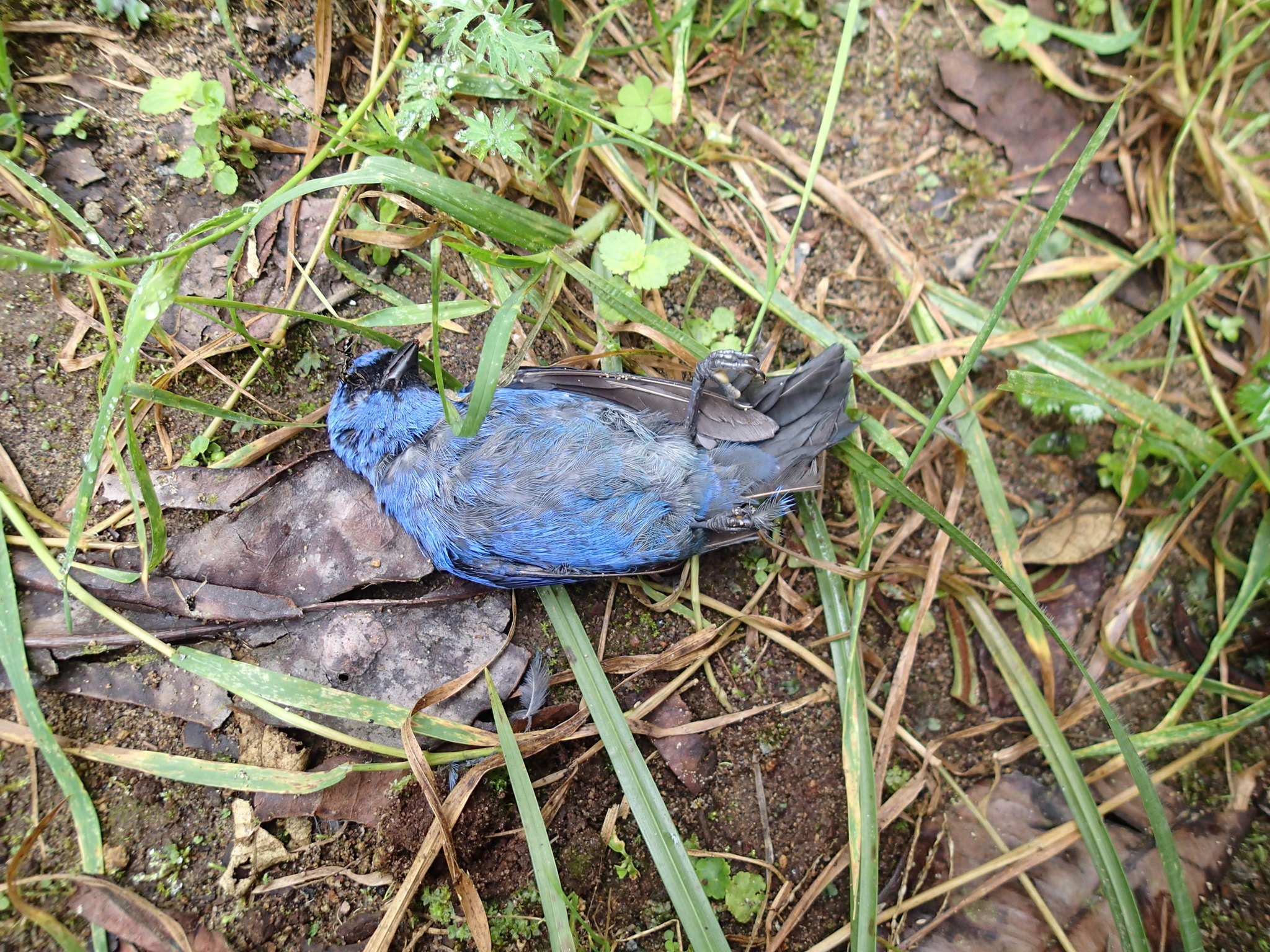
Dead blue-and-black tanager

The blue-and-black tanager breeds from February to August. It makes cup nests out of moss and rootlets, lined on the outside with Chusquea bamboo leaves and on the inside with fibers and animal hair. Nests have been recorded in May and June, and are 8 cm (3.1 in) wide and 7 cm (2.8 in) tall on the outside and 6 cm (2.4 in) wide and 3 cm (1.2 in) deep on the inside. Nests have been recorded at heights of 3.8–5 m (12–16 ft) above the ground on small trees. Eggs are laid in clutches of two, and are pale blue with cinnamon splotching. They measure 20 mm–20.3 mm × 14.1 mm–15 mm (0.79 in–0.80 in × 0.56 in–0.59 in) and weigh 2.1–2.2 g (0.074–0.078 oz). Begging young have been reported in January, while fledglings have been reported in May.

== Conservation status ==
The blue-and-black tanager is listed as being of least concern by the International Union for Conservation of Nature (IUCN) on the IUCN Red List due to its large range, relative commonness, and lack of significant population declines. The subspecies atrocoerulea, which is considered a distinct species by the IUCN, is also listed as least concern for the above reasons. However, the species is threatened by habitat destruction that is reducing its population.
