= Mixed-species flock =

Swarming behaviour of birds when foraging

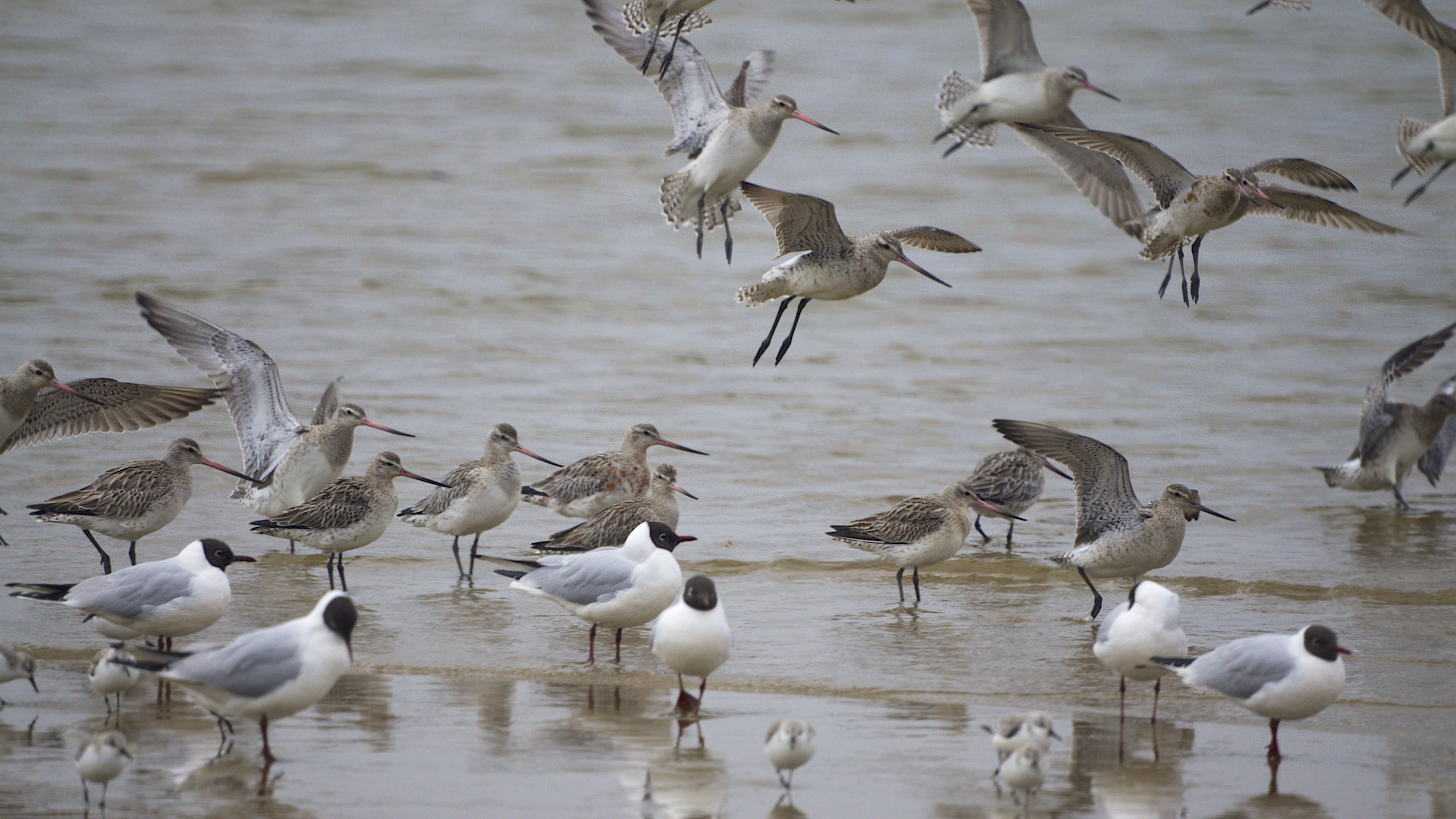
Black-headed gulls, bar-tailed godwits and sanderlings foraging on a beach

A mixed-species feeding flock, also termed a mixed-species foraging flock, mixed hunting party or informally bird wave, is a flock of usually insectivorous birds of different species that join each other and move together while foraging. These are different from feeding aggregations, which are congregations of several species of bird at areas of high food availability.

While it is currently unknown how mixed-species foraging flocks originate, researchers have proposed a few mechanisms for their initiation. Many believe that nuclear species play a vital role in mixed-species flock initiation. Additionally, the forest structure is hypothesized to play a vital role in these flocks' formation. In Sri Lanka, for example, vocal mimicry by the greater racket-tailed drongo might have a key role in the initiation of mixed-species foraging flocks, while in parts of the American tropics packs of foraging golden-crowned warblers might play the same role.

== Composition ==
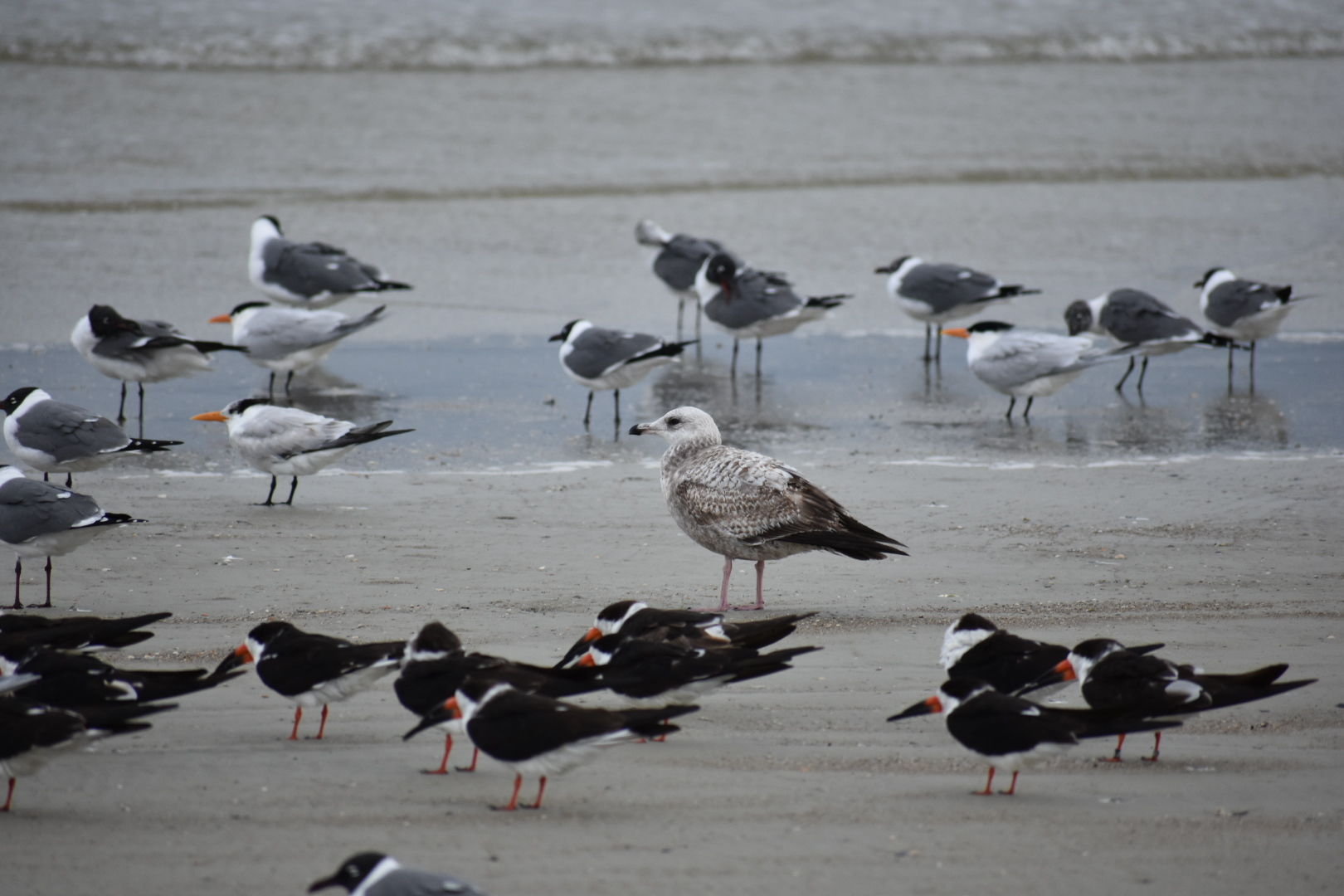
Mixed-species flock containing American herring gull, royal tern, laughing gull, and black skimmer foraging on a beach

Mixed-species foraging flocks tend to form around a "nuclear" species. Researchers believe nuclear species both stimulate the formation of a mixed-species flock and maintain the cohesion between bird species. They tend to have a disproportionately large influence on the flock. Nuclear species have a few universal qualities. Typically, they are both generalists that employ a gleaning foraging strategy and intraspecifically social birds. "Associate" or "attendant" species are birds that trail the flock only after it has entered their territory. Researchers have shown that these species tend to have a higher fitness following mixed-species foraging flocks. The third class of birds found in mixed-species flocks have been termed "sentinel" species. Unlike nuclear species, sentinels are fly-catching birds that are rarely gregarious. Their role is to alert the other birds in the mixed-species flock to the arrival of potential predators.

== Benefits ==
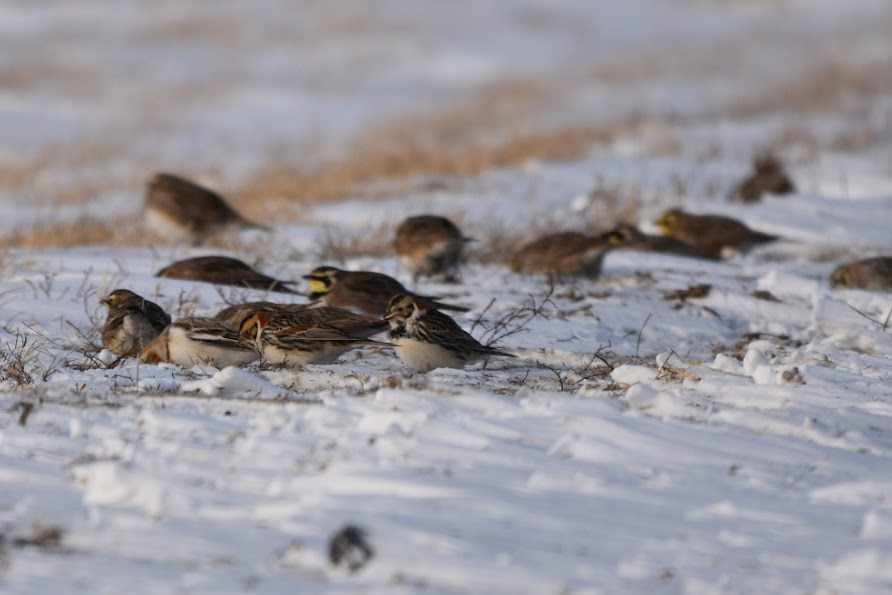
Mixed-species flock containing Lapland longspur, horned lark, and snow bunting foraging in the snow

Ecologists generally assume that species in the same ecological niche compete for resources. The formation of mixed-species flocks demonstrates a possible exception to this universal ecological assumption. Instead of competing with one another for limited resources, some bird species who share the same food source can co-exist in mixed-species flocks. In fact, the more similar body size, taxonomy, and foraging style two bird species are, the more likely they are to be found cooperating in mixed-species flocks. Researchers have proposed two primary evolutionary mechanisms to explain the formation of mixed-species flocks. The first mechanistic explanation is that these different bird species cooperate to gain access to more food. Studies have shown that birds in mixed-species flocks are more likely to spot potential food sources, avoid already exploited locations, and drive insects out of hiding. The second mechanistic explanation is that birds join mixed-species flocks to avoid predation. A bird reduces its risk of being eaten when it is surrounded by other birds who can be potential food for the predator instead. Other studies have hypothesized that multi-species flocks form because large groups reduce a predator's ability to single out one prey, while others have hypothesized that multi-species flocks are more likely to spot predators.

== Costs ==
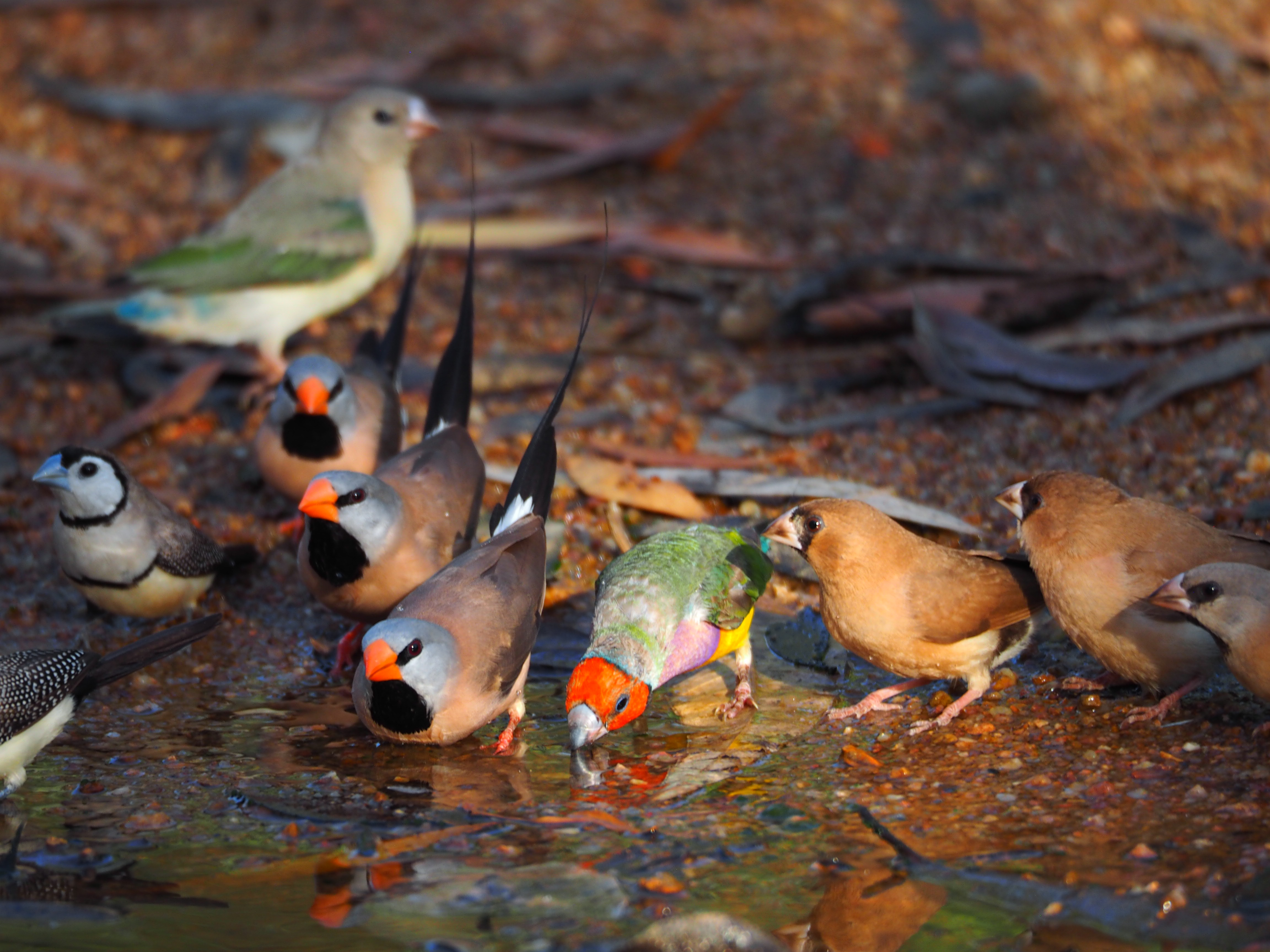
Mixed-species finch flock including long-tailed finch, masked finch, and Gouldian finch at Ferguson River in Australia

Mixed-species feeding flocks are not purely beneficial for their member species. Some bird species suffer a higher cost when joining mixed-species flocks. Studies have shown that some bird species will leave their standard optimal feeding area to travel to a worse foraging location in order to follow the path of a mixed-species flock. Birds may also be forced to change their foraging strategy in order to conform with the flock. Another third proposed cost of mixed-species flocks is an increased risk of kleptoparasitism.

== In the Holarctic ==
In the North Temperate Zone, they are typically led by Paridae (tits and chickadees), often joined by nuthatches, treecreepers, woodpeckers (such as the downy woodpecker and lesser spotted woodpecker), kinglets, and in North America Parulidae (New World "warblers") – all insect-eating birds. This behavior is particularly common outside the breeding season.

The advantages of this behavior are not certain, but evidence suggests that it confers some safety from predators, especially for the less watchful birds such as vireos and woodpeckers, and also improves feeding efficiency, perhaps because arthropod prey that flee one bird may be caught by another.

== In the Neotropics ==
Insectivorous feeding flocks reach their fullest development in tropical forests, where they are a typical feature of bird life. In the Neotropics the leaders or "core" members may be black-throated shrike-tanagers in southern Mexico, or three-striped warblers elsewhere in Central America. In South America, core species may include antbirds such as Thamnomanes, antshrikes, Furnariidae (ovenbirds and woodcreepers) like the buff-fronted foliage-gleaner or the olivaceous woodcreeper, or Parulidae (New World "warblers") like the golden-crowned warblers. In open cerrado habitat, it may be white-rumped or white-banded tanagers. Core species often have striking plumage and calls that attract other birds; they are often also known to be very active sentinels, providing warning of would-be predators.

But while such easy-to-locate bird species serve as a focal point for flock members, they do not necessarily initiate the flock. In one Neotropic mixed flock feeding on swarming termites, it was observed that buff-throated warbling finches were most conspicuous. As this species is not an aerial insectivore, it is unlikely to have actually initiated the flock rather than happening across it and joining in. And while Basileuterus species are initiators as well as core species, mixed flocks of Tangara species – in particular red-necked, brassy-breasted, and green-headed tanagers – often initiate formation of a larger and more diverse feeding flock, of which they are then only a less significant component.

Nine-primaried oscines make up much of almost every Neotropical mixed-species feeding flock. Namely, these birds are from families such as the cardinals, Parulidae (New World "warblers"), and in particular Passerellidae (American "sparrows") and Thraupidae (tanagers). Other members of a Neotropic mixed feeding flock may come from most of the local families of smaller diurnal insectivorous birds, and can also include woodpecker, toucans, and trogons. Most Furnariidae do not participate in mixed flocks, though there are exceptions such as Synallaxis spinetails and some species of the woodcreeper subfamily – e.g. those mentioned above or the lesser woodcreeper – are common or even "core" members. Among the tyrant flycatchers there are also some species joining mixed flocks on a somewhat regular basis, including the sepia-capped flycatcher, eared pygmy tyrant, white-throated spadebill, and Oustalet's tyrannulet.

However, even of commonly participating families not all species join mixed flocks. There are genera such as Vireo in which some species do not join mixed flocks, while others (e.g., the red-eyed vireo) will even do so in their winter quarters. Of the three subspecies groups of the yellow-rumped warbler, only one (Audubon's warbler) typically does. And while the importance of certain Thraupidae in initiating and keeping together mixed flocks has been mentioned already, for example the black-goggled tanager is an opportunistic feeder that will appear at but keep its distance from any disturbance—be it a mixed feeding flock, an army ant column or a group of monkeys – and pick off prey trying to flee.

Gnateaters are notable for their absence from these flocks, while swifts and swallows rarely join them, but will if there is for example an ant or termite swarm. Cotingidae (cotingas) are mainly opportunistic associates which rarely join flocks for long if they do so at all; the same holds true for most Muscicapoidea (mockingbirds and relatives), though some thrushes may participate on more often. And though most Tityridae rarely join mixed flocks, becards do so regularly. Tapaculos are rarely seen with mixed flocks, though the collared crescentchest, doubtfully assigned to that family, may be a regular member. Icteridae (grackles and relatives) are also not too often seen to take part in these assemblages, though caciques like the golden-winged or red-rumped cacique join mixed flocks on a somewhat more regular basis. Cuculiformes (cuckoos and allies) are usually absent from mixed feeding flocks, but some – for example, the squirrel cuckoo – can be encountered not infrequently.

Some species appear to prefer when certain others are present: Cyanolyca jays like to flock with unicolored jays and the emerald toucanets species complex. Many Icteridae associate only with related species, but the western subspecies of the yellow-backed oriole associates with jays and the band-backed wren.

Other species participate to varying extents depending on location or altitude – presumably, the different species composition of mixed flocks at varying locations allows these irregular members more or less opportunity to get food. Such species include the grey-hooded flycatcher, or the plain antvireo and the red-crowned ant tanager which are often recorded in lowland flocks but rarely join them at least in some more montane regions.

A typical Neotropic mixed feeding flock moves through the forest at about 0.3 kilometers per hour (0.19 mph), with different species foraging in their preferred niches (on the ground, on trunks, in high or low foliage, etc.). Some species follow the flock all day, while others – such as the long-billed gnatwren – join it only as long as it crosses their own territories.

== In the Old World tropics ==
The flocks in the Old World are often much more loosely bonded than in the Neotropics, many being only casual associations lasting the time the flock of core species spends in the attendants' territory. The more stable flocks are observed in tropical Asia, and especially Sri Lanka. Flocks there may number several hundred birds spending the entire day together, and an observer in the rain forest may see virtually no birds except when encountering a flock. For example, as a flock approaches in the Sinharaja Forest Reserve in Sri Lanka, the typical daytime quiet of the jungle is broken by the noisy calls of the orange-billed babbler and greater racket-tailed drongo, joined by species such as the ashy-headed laughingthrush, Kashmir flycatcher, and velvet-fronted nuthatch.

A mixed flock in the Cordillera Central of Luzon in the Philippines was mainly composed of bar-bellied cuckooshrikes, Philippine fairy-bluebirds, and violaceous crows. Luzon hornbills were also recorded as present. With the crows only joining later and the large hornbills probably only opportunistic attendants rather than core species, it is likely that this flock was started by one of the former species – probably the bold and vocal cuckoo-shrikes rather than the more retiring fairy-bluebirds, which are known to seek out such opportunities to forage.

African rainforests also hold mixed-species flocks, the core species including bulbuls and sunbirds, and attendants being as diverse as the red-billed dwarf hornbill and the tit-hylia, the smallest bird of Africa. Drongos and paradise-flycatchers are sometimes described as the sentinels of the flock, but they are also known to steal prey from other flock members. Acanthizidae are typical core members in New Guinea and Australia; in Australia, fairy-wrens are also significant. The core species are joined by birds of other families such as minivets.
