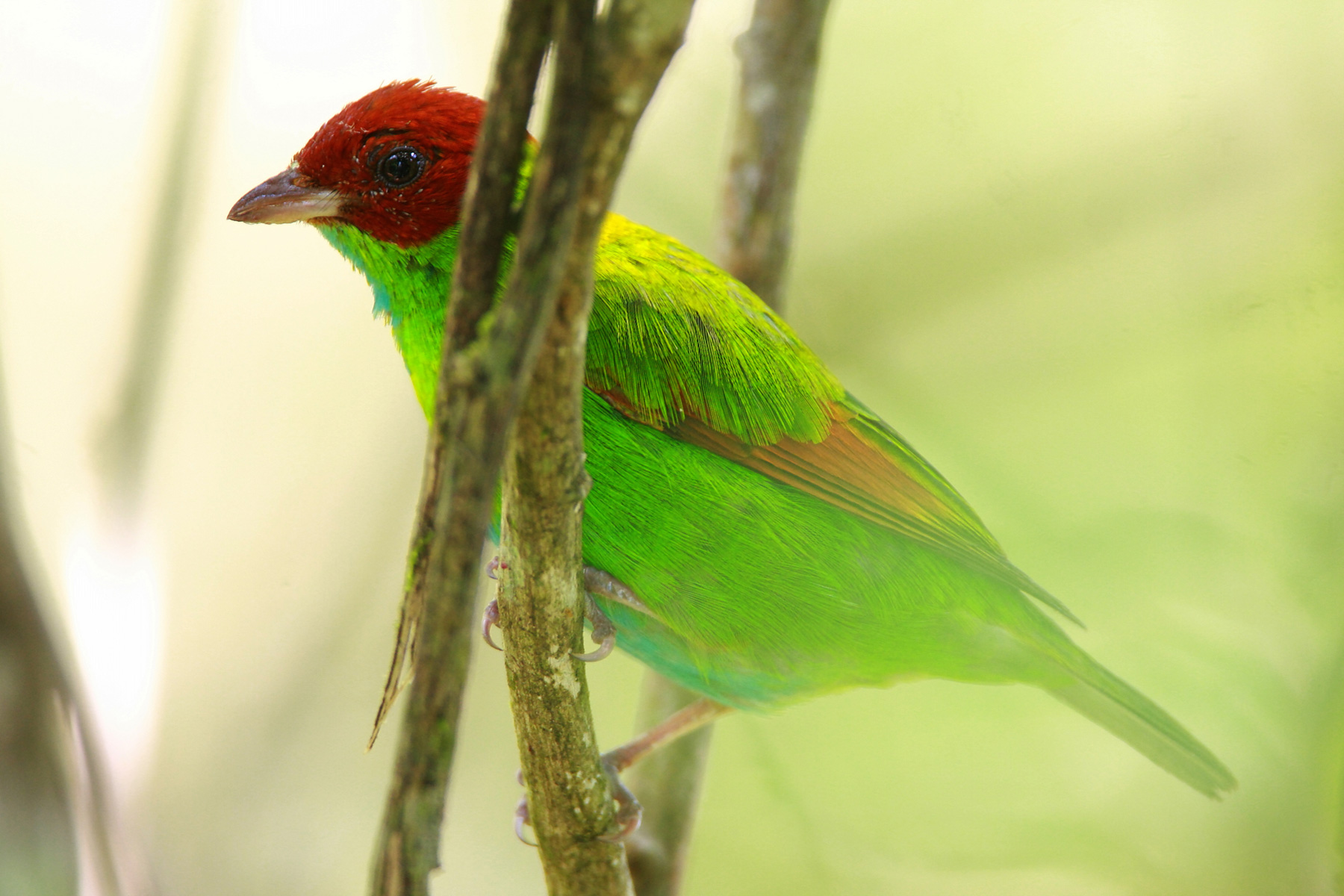

Conservation status
- Least Concern (IUCN 3.1)

Scientific classification
- Kingdom: Animalia
- Phylum: Chordata
- Class: Aves
- Order: Passeriformes
- Family: Thraupidae
- Genus: Tangara
- Species: T. lavinia

Binomial name
- Tangara lavinia (Cassin, 1858)

= Rufous-winged tanager =

Species of bird

The rufous-winged tanager (Tangara lavinia) is a species of bird in the family Thraupidae. It is found in Colombia, Costa Rica, Ecuador, Honduras, Nicaragua, and Panama. Its natural habitats are subtropical or tropical moist lowland forests and heavily degraded former forest.

== Taxonomy and systematics ==
The rufous-winged tanager was first described as Castille lavinia by John Cassin in 1858, on the basis of a specimen collected by W.S. Wood, Jr. at the Isthmus of Panama. The generic name Tangara is from the Tupí word tangara, meaning dancer. The specific name lavinia is after the artist Lavinia Bowen. Rufous-winged tanager is the official common name designated by the International Ornithologists' Union (IOC). Other names for the species include rufous winged tanager and Lavinia's tanager.

It is one of 27 species in the genus Tangara. Within the genus, it was placed in a species group with the bay-headed tanager and rufous-cheeked tanager by Isler and Isler in 1987. This placement is supported by mitochondrial DNA evidence. Within the species group, the rufous-winged tanager is sister to the bay-headed tanager.

=== Subspecies ===
There are three recognized subspecies of the saffron-crowned tanager, which differ in the extent of blue on their undersides.

- T. l. cara (Bangs, 1905): Occurs from extreme eastern Guatemala to Honduras, Nicaragua, and Costa Rica. Blue is present on the belly, but not on the throat or breast.
- T. l. dalmasi (Hellmayr, 1910): It is found in Panama. It has a small spot of blue on the chin that does not extend to the breast.
- T. l. lavinia (Cassin, 1858): The nominate, it occurs from extreme eastern Panama, along Colombia, to western Ecuador. It has a line of blue running down the center of its throat to the breast.

== Behavior and ecology ==
=== Diet ===
The rufous-winged tanager feeds on insects and fruit.
