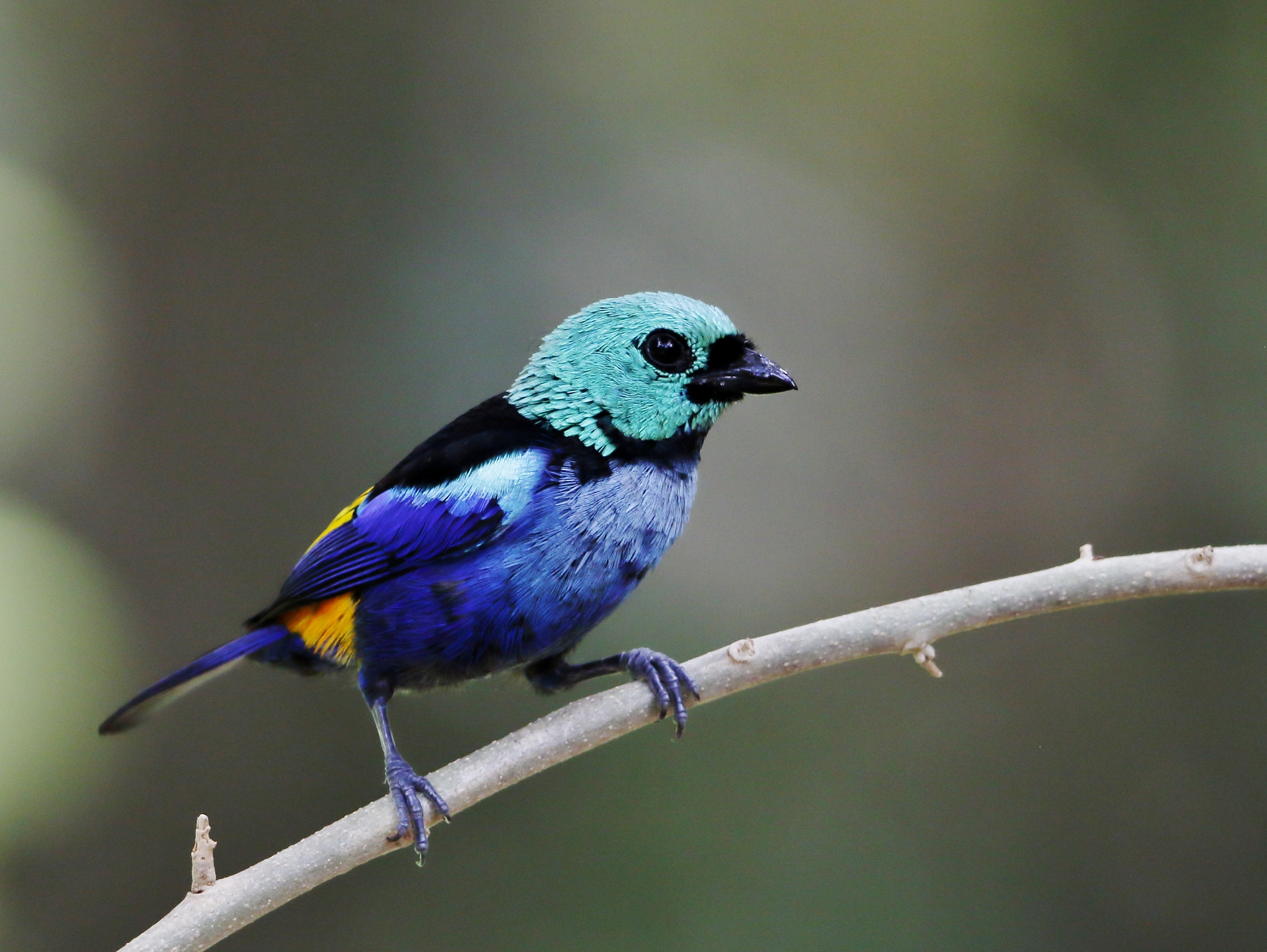

Conservation status
- Vulnerable (IUCN 3.1)
- CITES Appendix II

Scientific classification
- Kingdom: Animalia
- Phylum: Chordata
- Class: Aves
- Order: Passeriformes
- Family: Thraupidae
- Genus: Tangara
- Species: T. fastuosa

Binomial name
- Tangara fastuosa (Lesson, R, 1831)

= Seven-colored tanager =

Species of bird

The seven-colored tanager (Tangara fastuosa) is a vulnerable species of bird in the family Thraupidae. It is endemic to forests in north-eastern Brazil. It resembles the overall greener green-headed tanager; a species confusingly known as the 'seven-colored tanager' (saíra-sete-cores) in Portuguese.

== Description ==
The seven-colored tanager is a 13.5 cm bird named for the spectacular range in coloration of its feathers.

- Turquoise-green: Head, chin, and mantle
- Black: Lores, area around bill, back, shoulders, and throat
- Bright blue: Breast and edge of tail
- Ultramarine blue: Belly
- Paler turquoise-blue: Wing-coverts
- Dark blue: Edging to wing feathers
- Orange: Edging to tertials, rump, and lower back
