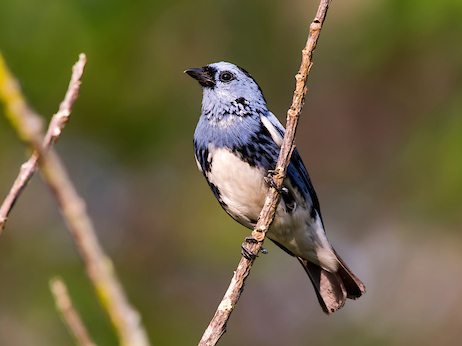

Conservation status
- Least Concern (IUCN 3.1)

Scientific classification
- Kingdom: Animalia
- Phylum: Chordata
- Class: Aves
- Order: Passeriformes
- Family: Thraupidae
- Genus: Tangara
- Species: T. brasiliensis

Binomial name
- Tangara brasiliensis (Linnaeus, 1766)
- Range in Brazil

= White-bellied tanager =

Species of bird

The white-bellied tanager (Tangara brasiliensis) is a medium-sized passerine bird in the tanager family Thraupidae. It is a resident bird of the Atlantic Forest of eastern Brazil. It is restricted to areas with humid forest. It was formerly considered as a subspecies of the turquoise tanager (Tangara mexicana).

== Taxonomy ==
The turquoise tanager was formally described in 1766 by the Swedish naturalist Carl Linnaeus in the 12th edition of his Systema Naturae under the binomial name Tanagra brasiliensis. His description was based on Mathurin Jacques Brisson's Le tangara blue de Brésil that Brisson had described and illustrated in 1760. The type locality is Rio de Janeiro. The white-bellied tanager is now placed in the genus Tangara that was introduced by Brisson.

The white-bellied tanager was formerly treated as a subspecies of the turquoise tanager (Tangara mexicana).

== Description ==
Adult birds are 14 cm (5.5 in) long. They are long-tailed and with a dark stout pointed bill. The adult is mainly dark blue and black, with turquoise edging to the primaries. It differs from the turquoise tanager in that it is larger, has an overall more silvery blue plumage, blue edging to the primaries and a white belly. The song is a fast squeaky chatter tic-tic-tic-tic-tic.

== Behaviour ==
It occurs in forest, woodland and cultivation. The bulky cup nest is built in a tree or shrub, and the female incubates three brown-blotched grey-green eggs.

These are social birds usually found in groups. They eat a wide variety of fruit and also take insects and other arthropods, often gleaned from twigs.
