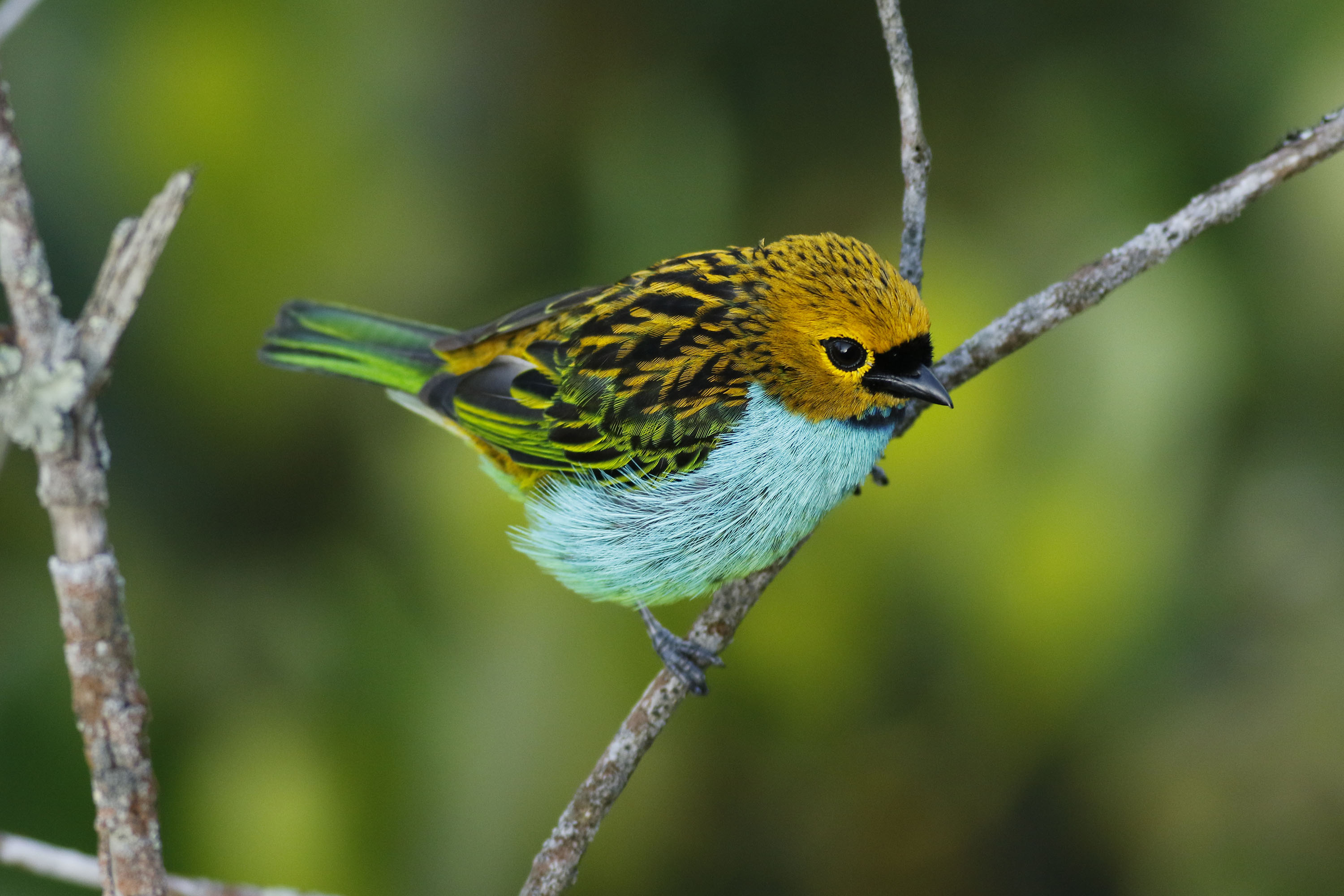

Conservation status
- Least Concern (IUCN 3.1)

Scientific classification
- Kingdom: Animalia
- Phylum: Chordata
- Class: Aves
- Order: Passeriformes
- Family: Thraupidae
- Genus: Tangara
- Species: T. cyanoventris

Binomial name
- Tangara cyanoventris (Vieillot, 1819)

Synonyms
- Tanagra cyanoventris Vieillot, 1819

= Gilt-edged tanager =

Species of bird

The gilt-edged tanager (Tangara cyanoventris) is a species of bird in the family Thraupidae. It is endemic to Brazil.

Its natural habitats are subtropical or tropical moist lowland forest, subtropical or tropical moist montane forest, and heavily degraded former forest.
