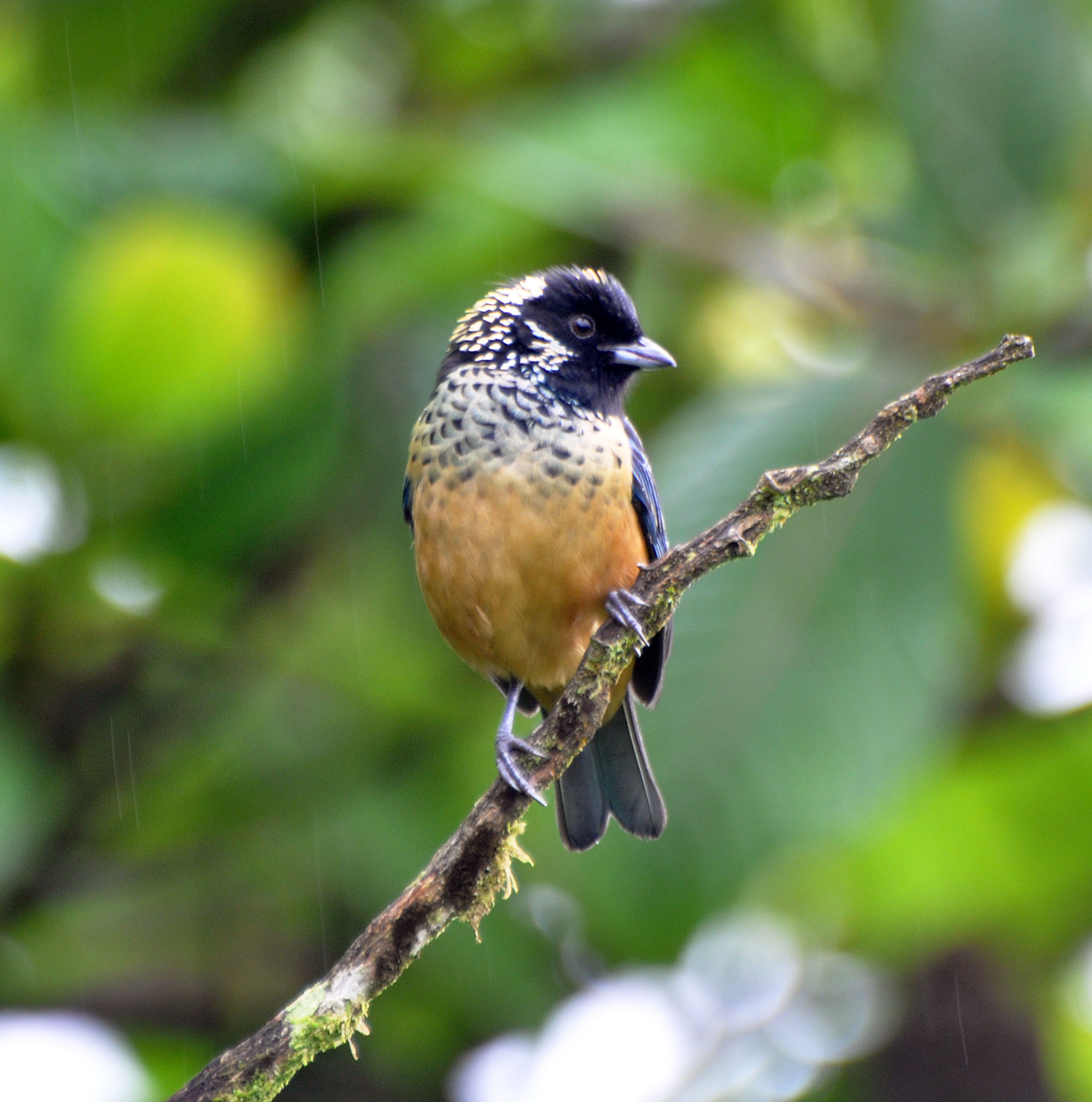

Conservation status
- Least Concern (IUCN 3.1)

Scientific classification
- Kingdom: Animalia
- Phylum: Chordata
- Class: Aves
- Order: Passeriformes
- Family: Thraupidae
- Genus: Tangara
- Species: T. dowii

Binomial name
- Tangara dowii (Salvin, 1863)

= Spangle-cheeked tanager =

Species of bird

The spangle-cheeked tanager (Tangara dowii) is a medium-sized passerine bird. This tanager is an endemic resident breeder in the highlands of Costa Rica and western Panama.

Formerly considered conspecific with the green-naped tanager, it is now known that these two species differ geographically and genetically.

It is common from about 1,200 to 3,000 m (3,900 to 9,800 ft) altitude in the canopy of epiphyte-laden wet mountain forests, and at lower levels in semi-open areas like clearings with trees, second growth and woodland edges. The bulky cup nest, lined with bromeliad leaves, is built in a tree fork or on a branch high amongst the epiphytes. The normal clutch is two eggs.

The adult spangle-cheeked tanager is 13 cm (5.1 in) long and weighs 20 g (0.71 oz). It has a mainly black head, upperparts and breast, with blue scaling on the breast, sides of the face and neck, and a rufous crown patch. The wings and tail have blue edgings. The rump is green and the belly is cinnamon. The sexes are very similar, but adult males have more extensive blue scaling. Immatures are generally duller, with no crown patch, and less distinct blue scaling.

Spangle-cheeked tanagers occur in pairs, family groups, or as part of a mixed-species feeding flock (particularly those containing common bush tanagers). They eat small fruit, usually swallowed whole, insects and spiders.

The spangle-cheeked tanager's call is a high tsip.

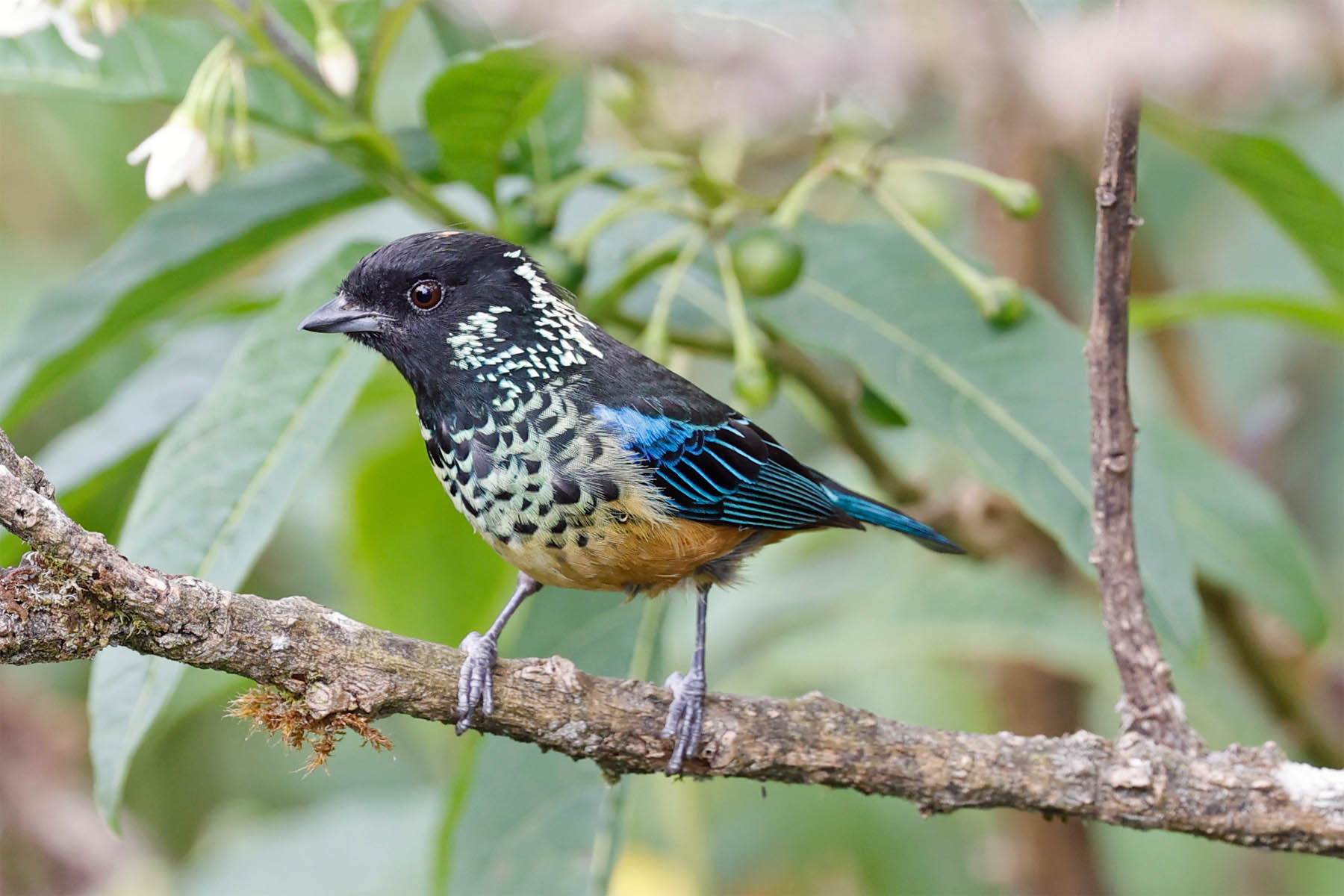
Talamanca Mountains, Costa Rica, 21 March 2024.
