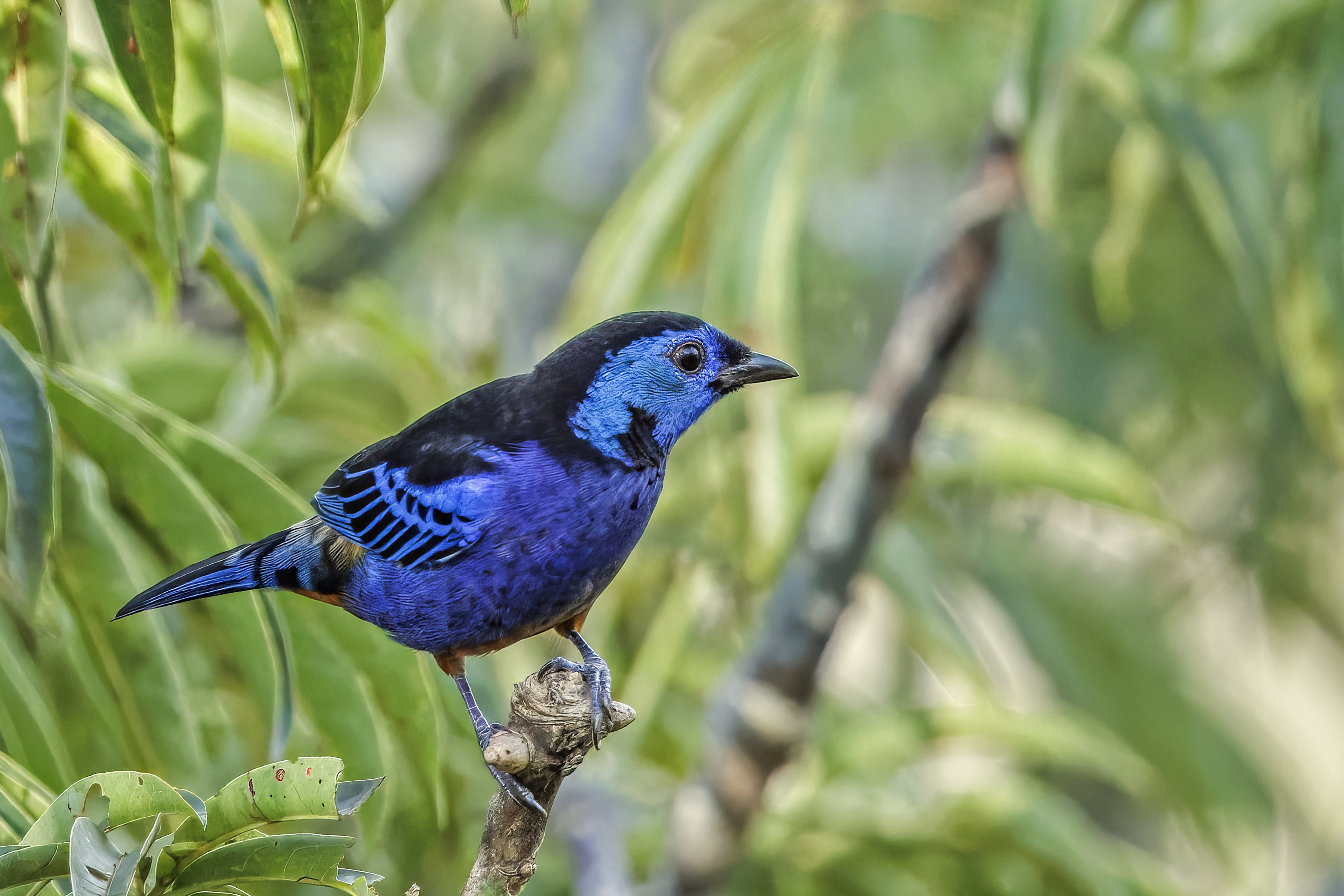
- Tangara velia iridina, Ecuador

Conservation status
- Least Concern (IUCN 3.1)

Scientific classification
- Kingdom: Animalia
- Phylum: Chordata
- Class: Aves
- Order: Passeriformes
- Family: Thraupidae
- Genus: Tangara
- Species: T. velia

Binomial name
- Tangara velia (Linnaeus, 1758)

Synonyms
- Motacilla Velia Linnaeus, 1758

= Opal-rumped tanager =

Species of bird

The opal-rumped tanager (Tangara velia) is a species of bird in the family Thraupidae. It is found in the Amazon and Atlantic Forest of South America. The population of the Atlantic Forest has a far paler chest than the other populations, and has often been considered a separate species as the silvery-breasted tanager (Tangara cyanomelas). Today most authorities treat it as a subspecies of the opal-rumped tanager.

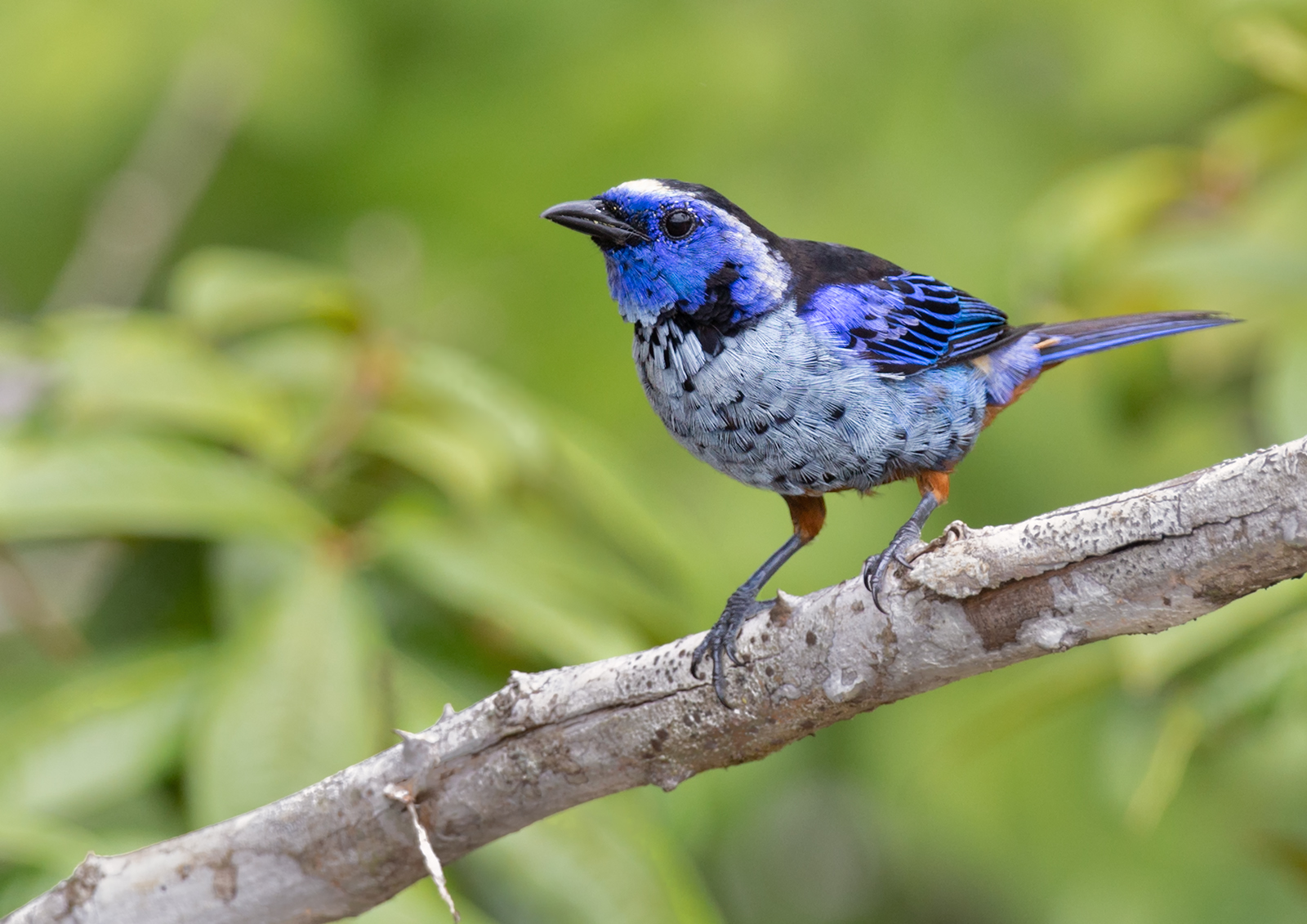
Silvery-breasted tanager (Tangara velia cyanomelas)

== Taxonomy ==
In 1743 the English naturalist George Edwards included an illustration and a description of the opal-rumped tanager in his A Natural History of Uncommon Birds. He used the English name "Red-belly'd Blue-bird". Edwards based his hand-coloured etching on a specimen owned by the Duke of Richmond that had been collected in Suriname. When in 1758 the Swedish naturalist Carl Linnaeus updated his Systema Naturae for the tenth edition, he placed the opal-rumped tanager with the wagtails in the genus Motacilla. Linnaeus included a brief description, coined the binomial name Motacilla velia, and cited Edwards' work. Linnaeus provided no explanation for the specific epithet; it is perhaps a misprint for the Ancient Greek elea, a small bird mentioned by Aristotle. The opal-rumped tanager is now placed in the genus Tangara that was introduced by the French zoologist Mathurin Jacques Brisson in 1760. The type locality is Suriname.

Four subspecies are recognised:

- Tangara velia velia (Linnaeus, 1758) – the Guianas and north Brazil
- Tangara velia cyanomelas (Wied-Neuwied, 1830) – east Brazil
- Tangara velia iridina (Hartlaub, 1841) – west Amazonia
- Tangara velia signata (Hellmayr, 1905) – northeast Brazil
