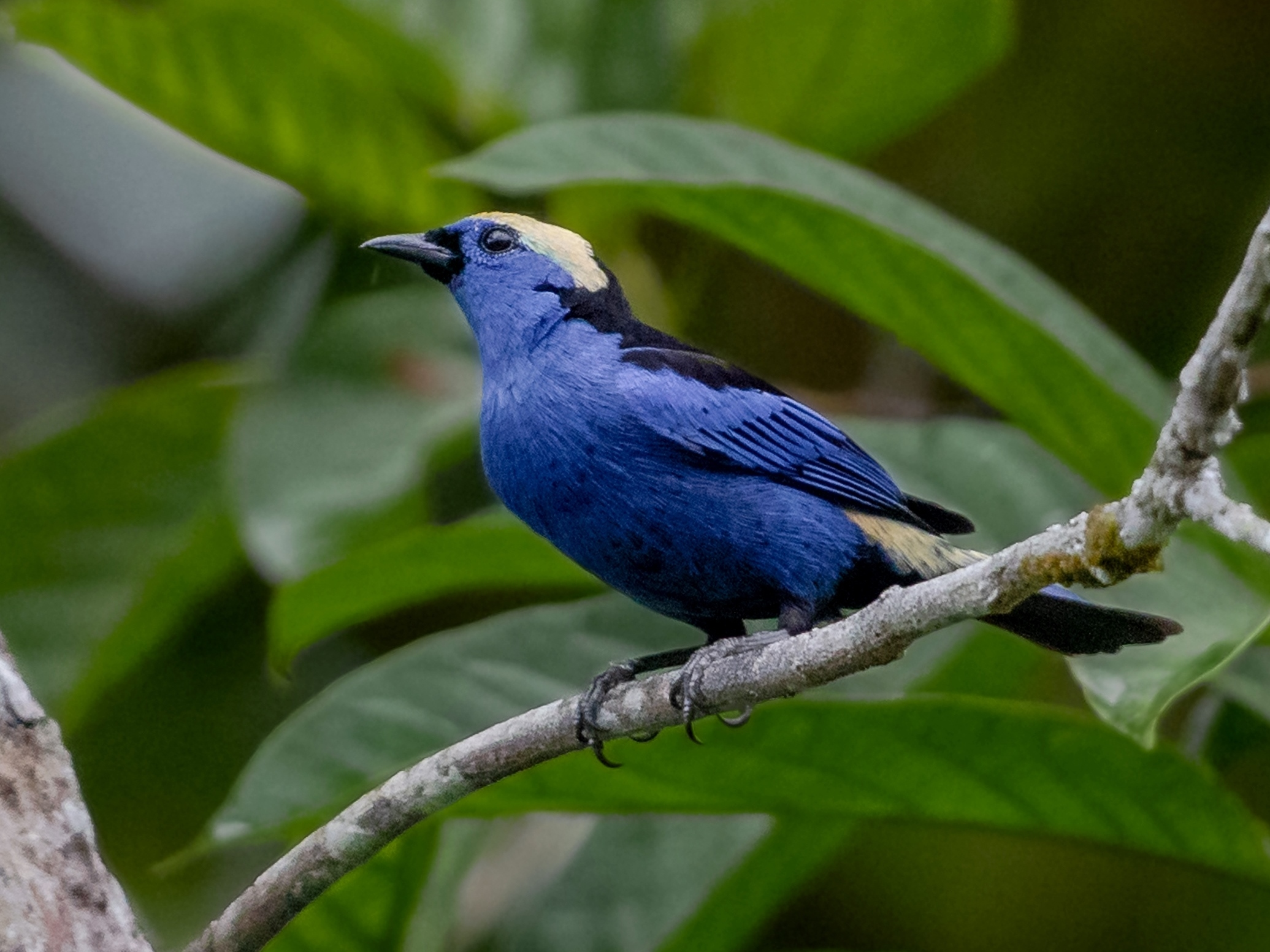

Conservation status
- Least Concern (IUCN 3.1)

Scientific classification
- Kingdom: Animalia
- Phylum: Chordata
- Class: Aves
- Order: Passeriformes
- Family: Thraupidae
- Genus: Tangara
- Species: T. callophrys

Binomial name
- Tangara callophrys (Cabanis, 1849)

Synonyms
- H[ypothlypis] callophrys (protonym)

= Opal-crowned tanager =

Species of bird

The opal-crowned tanager (Tangara callophrys) is a species of bird in the family Thraupidae, the tanagers. It is one of 49 species in the genus Tangara. It is found in the eastern Andes drainages to the western Amazon Basin in southern Colombia, eastern Ecuador and Peru and a region of northwestern Bolivia; and Brazil in southwestern-western Amazonas state and Acre.

Its natural habitat is subtropical or tropical moist lowland forests.

== Distribution ==
The opal-crowned tanager is found in one contiguous range centered on Amazonian eastern Peru-Ecuador, southeastern Colombia, and the very west of Amazonas state, Brazil; all of Acre state is included in the south with southern Peru, and a border region of extreme northwestern Bolivia.

A small disjunct population exists 100 km west in southern Colombia.
