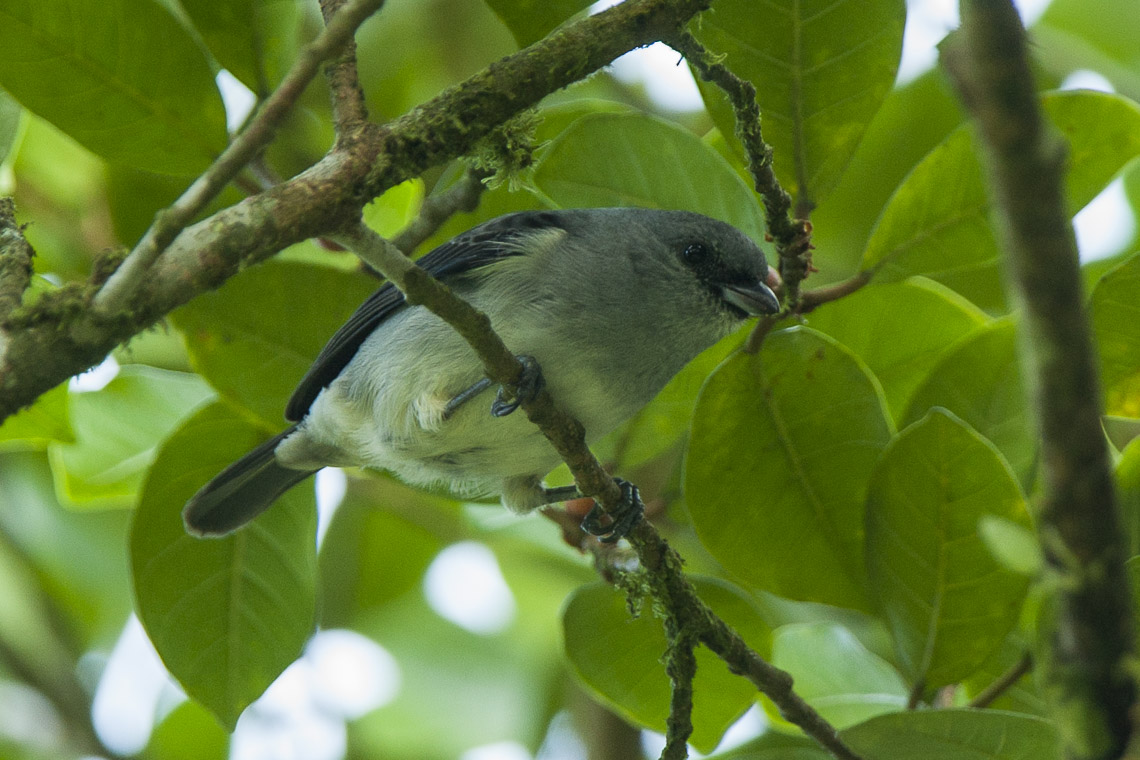

Conservation status
- Least Concern (IUCN 3.1)

Scientific classification
- Kingdom: Animalia
- Phylum: Chordata
- Class: Aves
- Order: Passeriformes
- Family: Thraupidae
- Genus: Tangara
- Species: T. inornata

Binomial name
- Tangara inornata (Gould, 1855)

Synonyms
- Calliste inornata (protonym)

= Plain-colored tanager =

Species of bird

The plain-colored tanager (Tangara inornata) is a species of bird in the family Thraupidae. It is found in Colombia, Costa Rica, and Panama. Its natural habitats are subtropical or tropical moist lowland forests and heavily degraded former forest.
