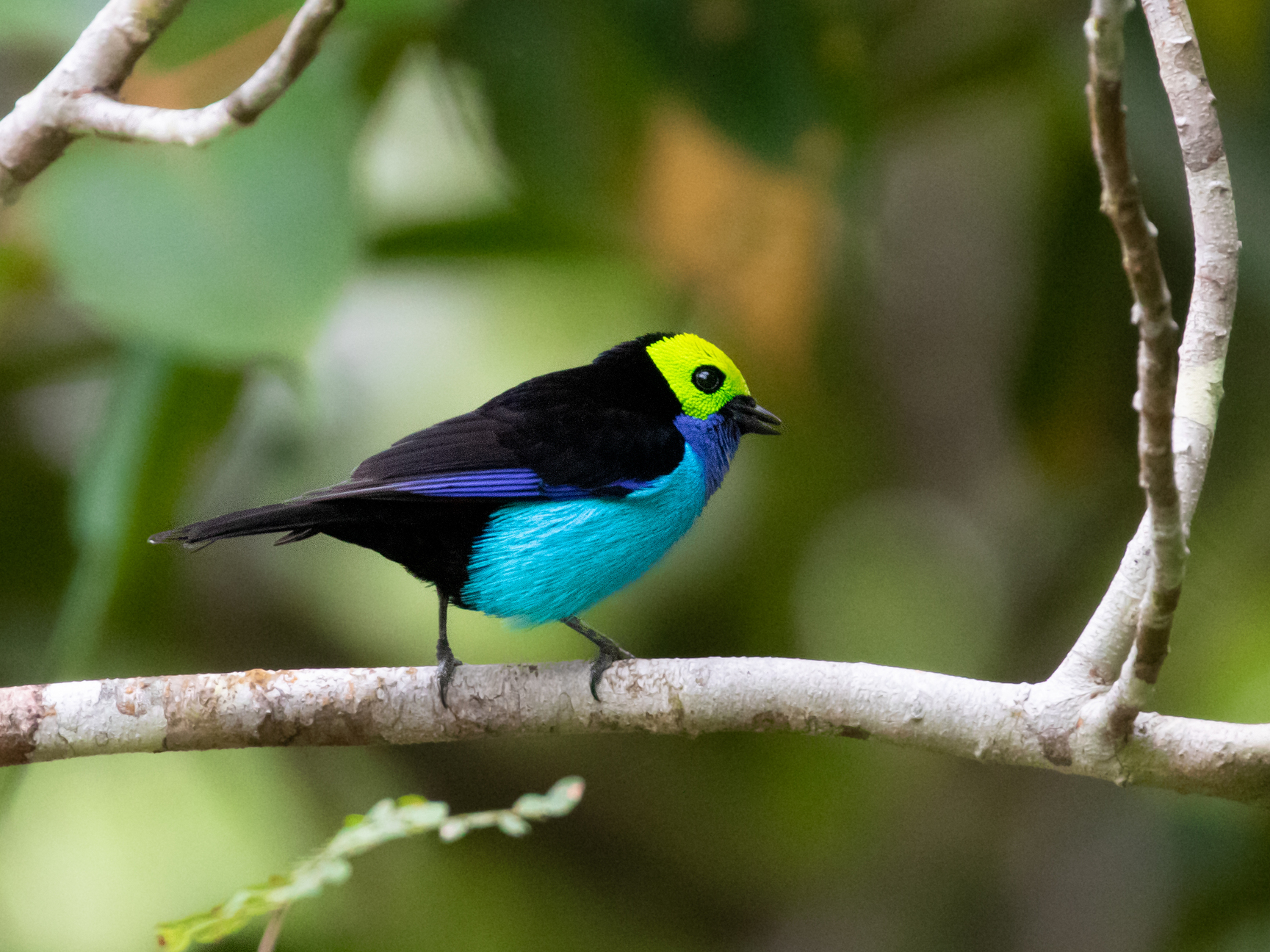
- In Yanachaga–Chemillén National Park, Peru

Conservation status
- Least Concern (IUCN 3.1)

Scientific classification
- Kingdom: Animalia
- Phylum: Chordata
- Class: Aves
- Order: Passeriformes
- Family: Thraupidae
- Genus: Tangara
- Species: T. chilensis

Binomial name
- Tangara chilensis (Vigors, 1832)

Synonyms
- Aglaïa Chilensis (protonym)

= Paradise tanager =

Species of bird

The paradise tanager (Tangara chilensis) is a brilliantly multicolored, medium-sized songbird whose length varies between 13.5 and 15 cm (5.3 to 6"). It has a light green head, sky blue underparts and black upper body plumage.The vivid colours of the paradise tanager have been linked to underlying achromatic feather layers (black or white) that enhance the brilliance of structural colours. Depending on subspecies, the behind is yellow and red or all red. The beak is black and the legs are grey. It is native to the Amazon rainforest.

Found in humid tropical and subtropical forests in the western and northern Amazon Basin in South America, the species can be found in Venezuela, Peru, Colombia, Ecuador, Bolivia and Brazil. Despite its scientific name, it is not found in Chile.
