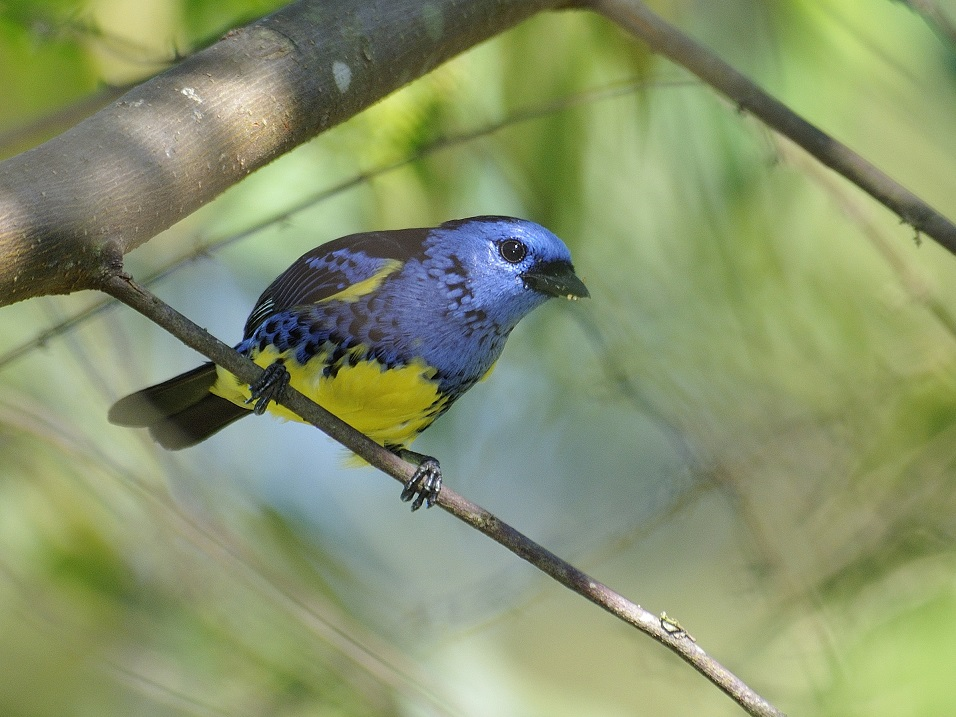

Conservation status
- Least Concern (IUCN 3.1)

Scientific classification
- Kingdom: Animalia
- Phylum: Chordata
- Class: Aves
- Order: Passeriformes
- Family: Thraupidae
- Genus: Tangara
- Species: T. mexicana

Binomial name
- Tangara mexicana (Linnaeus, 1766)
- Range

Synonyms
- Tanagra mexicana Linnaeus, 1766

= Turquoise tanager =

Species of bird

The turquoise tanager (Tangara mexicana) is a medium-sized passerine bird in the tanager family Thraupidae. It is a resident bird from Trinidad, much of Brazil, Colombia, and Venezuela, and south to Bolivia. Despite its scientific name, it is not found in Mexico. It is restricted to areas with humid forest, with its primary distribution being the Amazon. It was formerly treated as being conspecific with the white-bellied tanager which is found in the Atlantic Forest of eastern Brazil.

It occurs in forest, woodland, and cultivation. The bulky cup nest is built in a tree or shrub, and the female incubates three brown-blotched grey-green eggs.

These are social birds usually found in groups. They eat a wide variety of fruit and also take insects and other arthropods, often gleaned from twigs.

== Taxonomy ==
The turquoise tanager was formally described in 1766 by the Swedish naturalist Carl Linnaeus in the 12th edition of his Systema Naturae under the binomial name Tanagra mexicana. His description was principally based on Mathurin Jacques Brisson's Le tangara blue de Cayenne that he had described and illustrated in 1760. The type locality is Cayenne in French Guiana. The turquoise tanager is now placed in the genus Tangara that was introduced by Brisson.

Four subspecies are recognised:

- T. m. vieilloti (Sclater, PL, 1857) – Trinidad
- T. m. media (Berlepsch & Hartert, 1902) – east Colombia and Venezuela
- T. m. mexicana (Linnaeus, 1766) – the Guianas to central Brazil
- T. m. boliviana (Bonaparte, 1851) – southeast Colombia to east Ecuador, east Peru, west Brazil and north Bolivia

The white-bellied tanager (Tangara brasiliensis) was formerly treated as a subspecies.

== Description ==
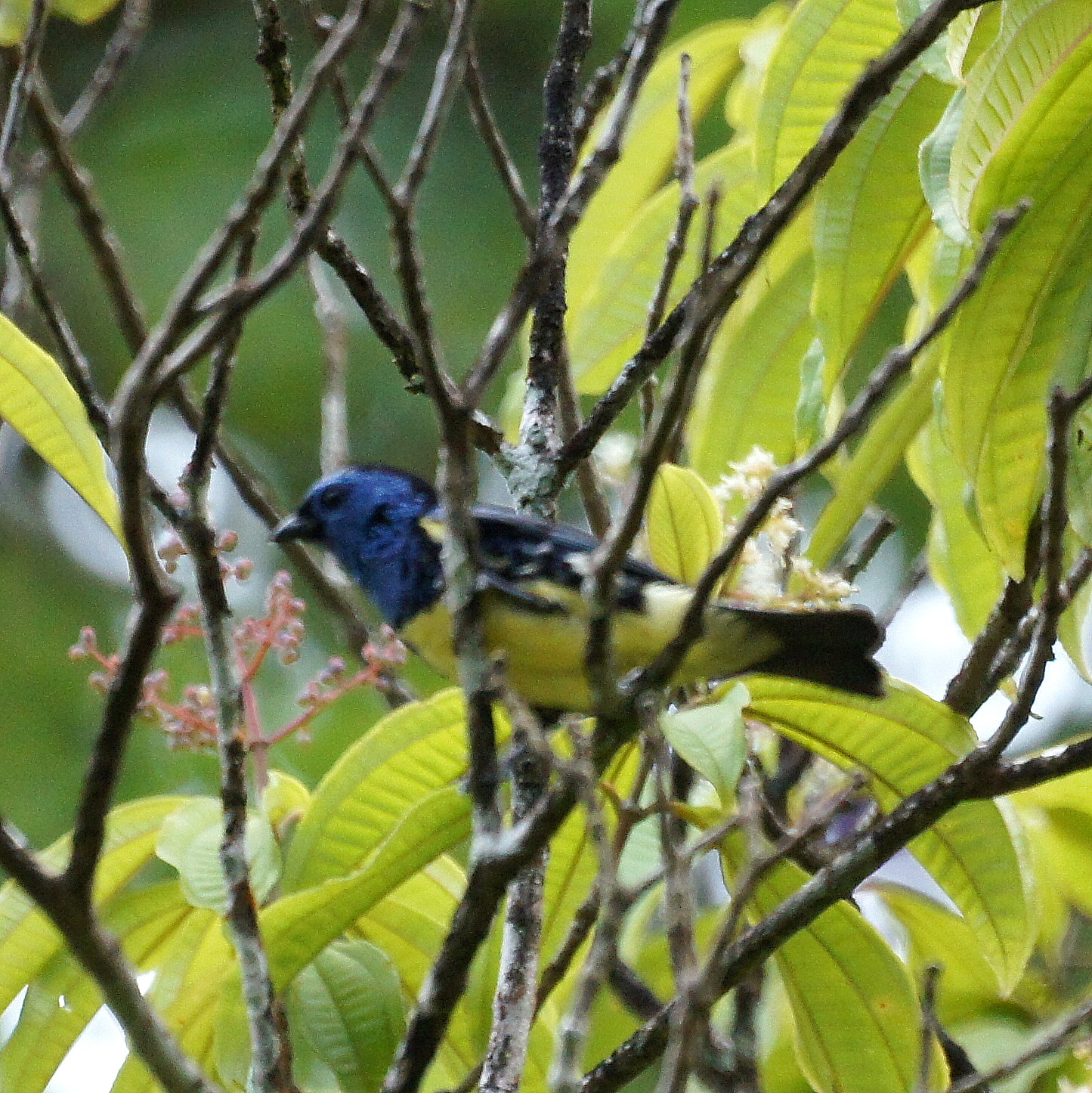
T. m. vieiloti from Trinidad is the darkest subspecies.

Adult turquoise tanagers are 14 cm (5.5 in) long and weigh 20 g (0.71 oz). They are long-tailed and with a dark stout pointed bill. The adult is mainly dark blue and black, with turquoise edging to the primaries. Most races have yellow lower underparts, but this is paler, more cream, in the nominate subspecies found in north-eastern South America. The Trinidadian race, T. m. vieiloti, has a darker blue head and breast and more vividly yellow underparts than the mainland taxa. Their song is a fast squeaky chatter tic-tic-tic-tic-tic.
