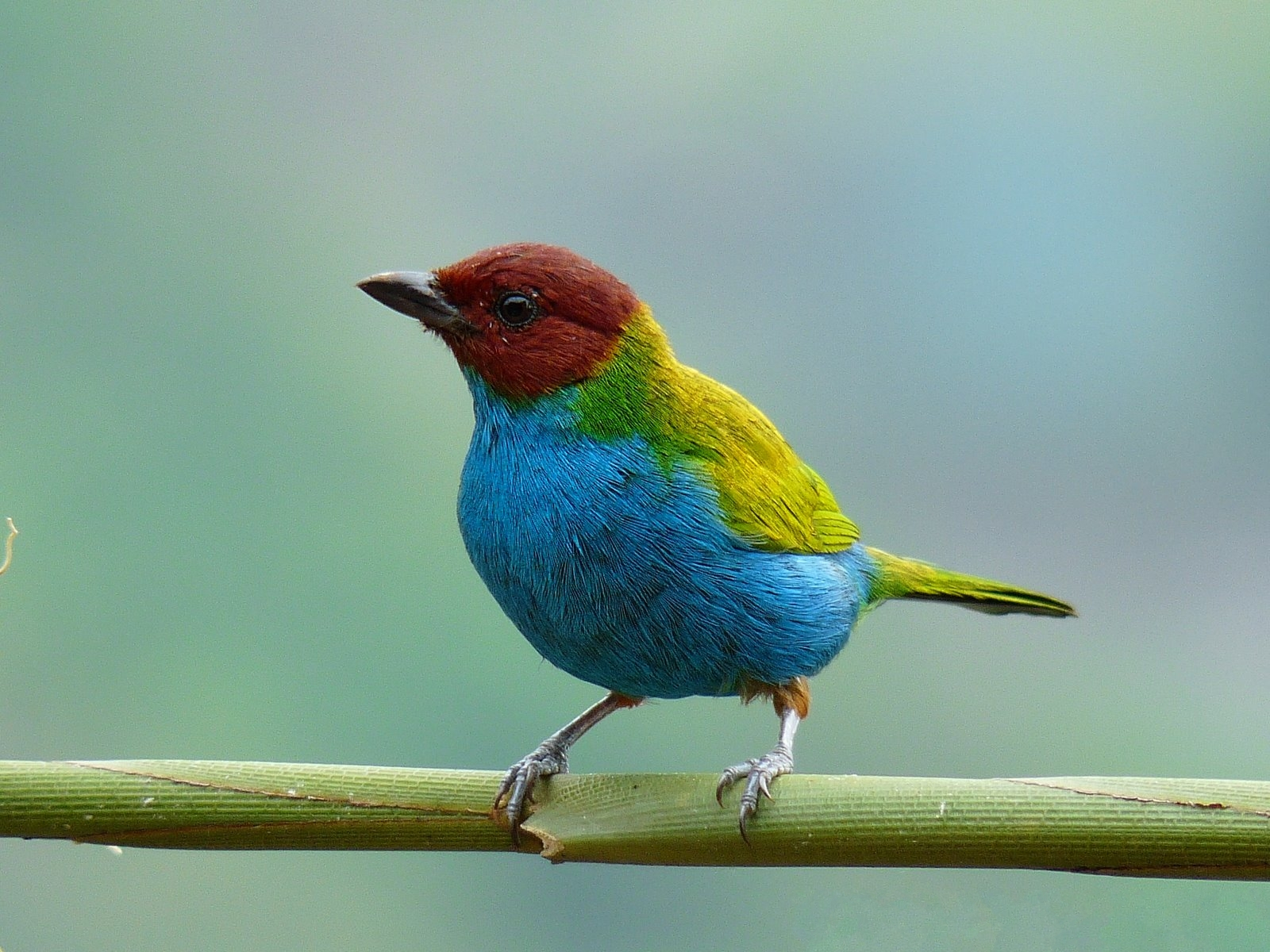
- In Colombia

Conservation status
- Least Concern (IUCN 3.1)

Scientific classification
- Kingdom: Animalia
- Phylum: Chordata
- Class: Aves
- Order: Passeriformes
- Family: Thraupidae
- Genus: Tangara
- Species: T. gyrola

Binomial name
- Tangara gyrola (Linnaeus, 1758)

Synonyms
- Fringilla gyrola Linnaeus, 1758; Tanagra gyrola Linnaeus, 1766

= Bay-headed tanager =

Species of bird

The bay-headed tanager (Tangara gyrola) is a medium-sized passerine bird. This tanager is a resident breeder in Costa Rica, Panama, South America south to Ecuador, Bolivia, and north-western Brazil, and on Trinidad.

== Taxonomy ==
The bay-headed tanager was formally described by the Swedish naturalist Carl Linnaeus in 1758 in the tenth edition of his Systema Naturae under the binomial name Fringilla gyrola. The specific epithet is a diminutive of the Latin gyrus meaning "ring". Linnaeus based his own description on the "red-headed green-finch" that had been described and illustrated by the English naturalist George Edwards in 1743 in his A Natural History of Uncommon Birds. The type locality is Suriname. The bay-headed tanager is now placed in the genus Tangara that was introduced by the French zoologist Mathurin Jacques Brisson in 1760.

Nine subspecies are recognised:

- T. g. bangsi (Hellmayr, 1911) – Nicaragua to west Panama
- T. g. deleticia (Bangs, 1908) – east Panama to central, west Colombia
- T. g. nupera Bangs, 1917 – southwest Colombia, west Ecuador and northwest Peru
- T. g. toddi Bangs & Penard, TE, 1921 – north Colombia and northwest, north Venezuela
- T. g. viridissima (Lafresnaye, 1847) – northeast Venezuela and Trinidad
- T. g. catharinae (Hellmayr, 1911) – central Colombia through east Ecuador and east Peru to west, central Bolivia
- T. g. parva Zimmer, JT, 1943 – east Colombia, south Venezuela, northeast Peru, and northwest Brazil
- T. g. gyrola (Linnaeus, 1758) – southeast Venezuela, the Guianas and north Brazil
- T. g. albertinae (Pelzeln, 1877) – central Brazil south of Amazon

== Description ==
Adult bay-headed tanagers are 14 cm (5.5 in) long and weigh 19.5 g (0.69 oz). The nominate subspecies T. g. gyrola is mainly green apart from a chestnut head, a blue or green belly, and a thin gold collar on the hind neck. Sexes are similar, but immatures are duller with chestnut-flecked green heads. There is considerable plumage variation between the various subspecies, and T. g. viridissima of northeast Venezuela and Trinidad has green underparts concolorous with the rest of the body plumage.

The bay-headed tanager's song is a slow seee, seee, seee, tsou, tsooy.

== Distribution and habitat ==
It occurs in forests, particularly in wetter areas. The bulky cup nest is built in a tree and the normal clutch is two brown-blotched white eggs. The female incubates the eggs for 13–14 days to hatching, with another 15–16 days before the chicks fledge.

== Behavior and ecology ==
These are social birds which eat mainly fruit, usually swallowed whole. Insects are also taken, mainly from the underside of branches.
