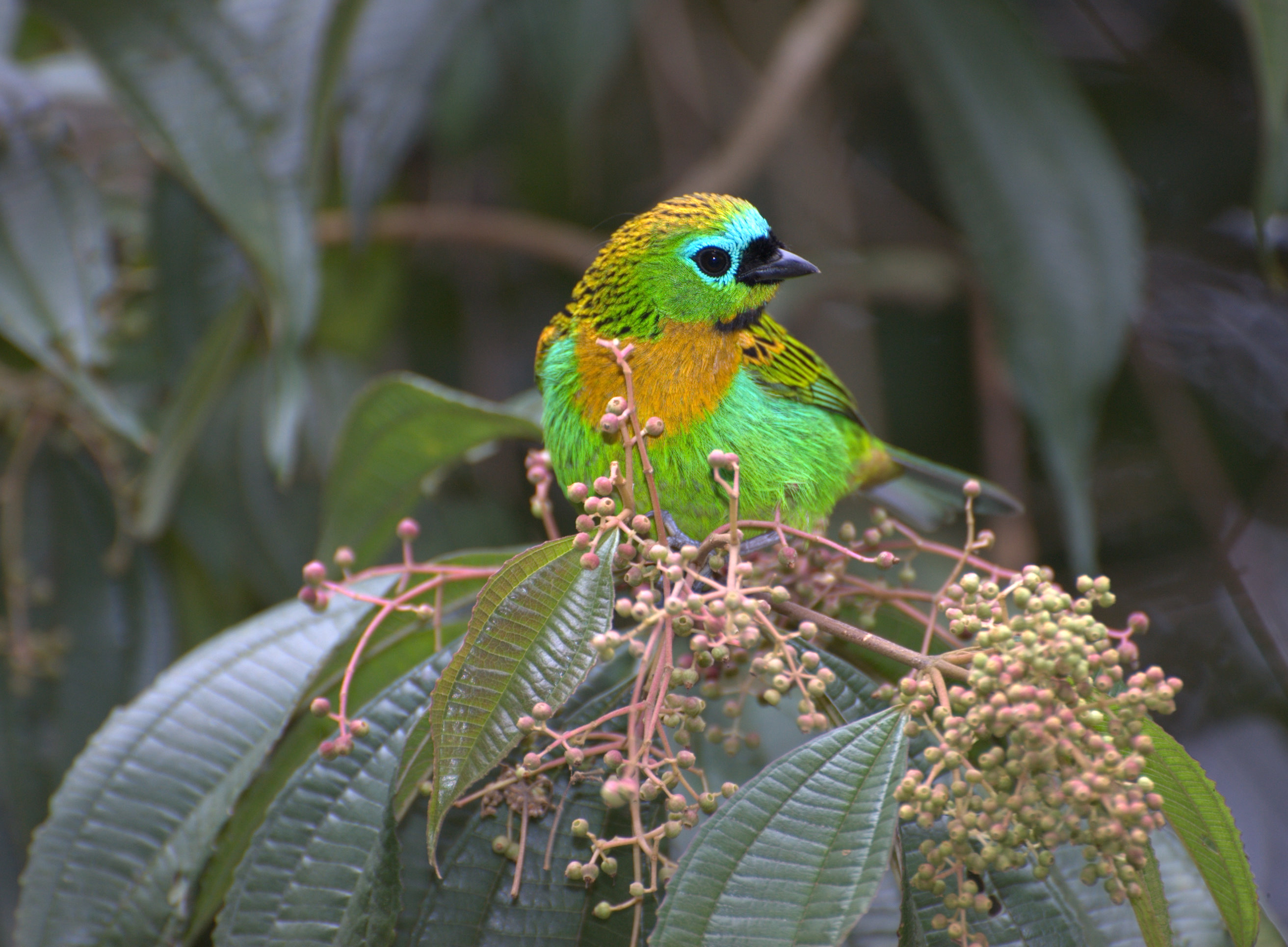

Conservation status
- Least Concern (IUCN 3.1)

Scientific classification
- Kingdom: Animalia
- Phylum: Chordata
- Class: Aves
- Order: Passeriformes
- Family: Thraupidae
- Genus: Tangara
- Species: T. desmaresti

Binomial name
- Tangara desmaresti (Vieillot, 1819)

Synonyms
- Tanagra Desmaresti protonym

= Brassy-breasted tanager =

Species of bird

The brassy-breasted tanager (Tangara desmaresti) is a species of bird in the family Thraupidae. It is endemic to Brazil. Its natural habitat is subtropical or tropical moist montane forests.

== Taxonomy and systematics ==
The brassy-breasted tanager was first described as Tanagra Desmaresti by Louis Pierre Vieillot in 1819 on the basis of a specimen from Brazil. The generic name Tangara is from the Tupí word tangara, meaning 'dancer'. The specific epithet desmaresti is a patronym in honor of Anselme Gaëtan Desmarest, who wrote the book Histoire des Tangaras.
