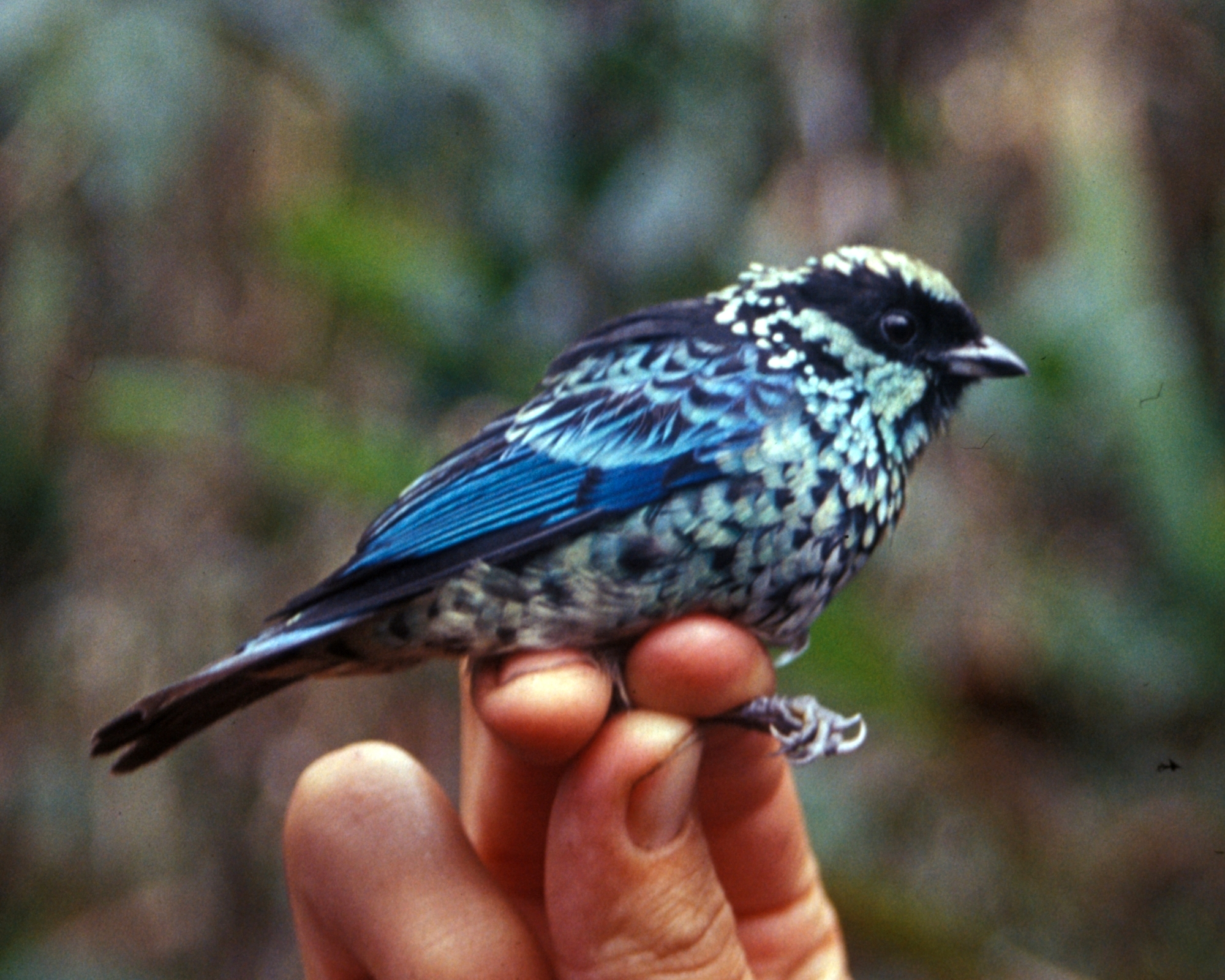
- Tangara nigroviridis cyanescens, Ecuador

Conservation status
- Least Concern (IUCN 3.1)

Scientific classification
- Kingdom: Animalia
- Phylum: Chordata
- Class: Aves
- Order: Passeriformes
- Family: Thraupidae
- Genus: Tangara
- Species: T. nigroviridis

Binomial name
- Tangara nigroviridis (Lafresnaye, 1843)

= Beryl-spangled tanager =

Species of bird

The beryl-spangled tanager (Tangara nigroviridis) is a small songbird of the northern Andes.

== Taxonomy ==
First described by Frédéric de Lafresnaye in 1843, the beryl-spangled tanager is one of 28 tanager species in the genus Tangara.

== Description ==
It is a small songbird, measuring 13 cm (5.1 in) in length. Its plumage is largely turquoise, though heavily marked with black spots and scales. Its breast and belly are primarily black, with opalescent greenish spotting.

== Habitat and distribution ==
The beryl-spangled tanager is found on the eastern slopes of the Andes from Venezuela, through Colombia, Ecuador, and Peru, to Bolivia. In Ecuador, it is found at elevations ranging from 700–2,500 m (2,300–8,200 ft), while in Peru it ranges somewhat higher – from 1,500–2,900 m (4,900–9,500 ft). It occurs in humid montane forest and second growth.
