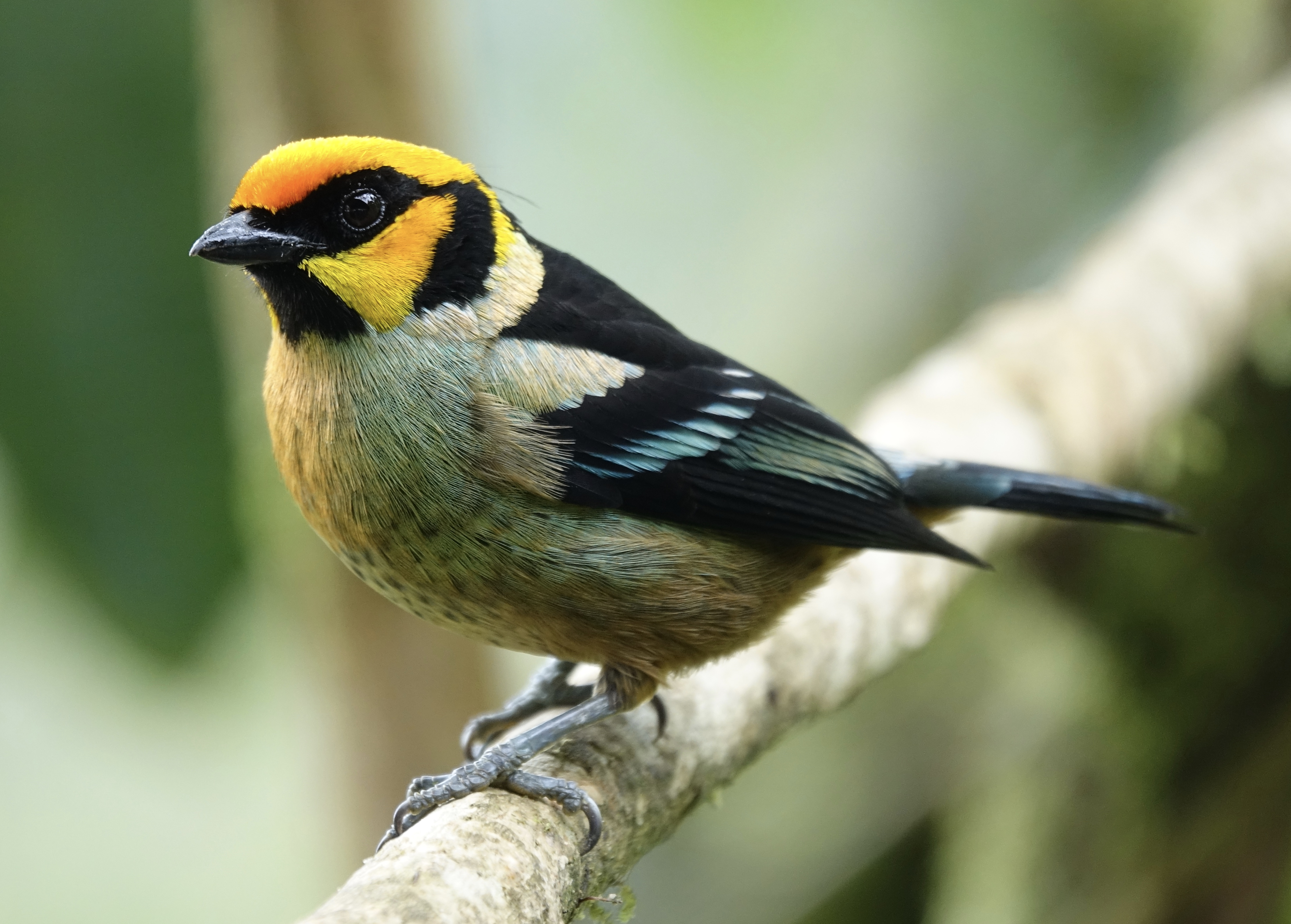
- Flame-faced tanager, Tangara parzudakii

Scientific classification
- Kingdom: Animalia
- Phylum: Chordata
- Class: Aves
- Order: Passeriformes
- Family: Thraupidae
- Genus: Tangara; Brisson, 1760

Type species
- = Aglaia paradisea

Species
- See text

Synonyms
- Tanagra Linnaeus, 1764

= Tangara (bird) =

Genus of birds

Tangara is a large genus of birds of the tanager family. It includes 27 species. All are from the Neotropics, and while most are fairly widespread, some have small distributions and are threatened. They are fairly small, ranging in size from 11.5–15 centimetres (4.5–5.9 in). This genus includes some of the most spectacularly colored birds of the world.

== Taxonomy and species list ==
The genus Tangara was introduced by the French zoologist Mathurin Jacques Brisson in 1760 with the paradise tanager (Tangara chilensis) as the type species. The name means "dancer" in the extinct Tupi language.

The genus formerly included additional species. A molecular phylogenetic study published in 2014 found that many of the members of Thraupis was embedded within Tangara. In the reorganization to create monophyletic genera, rather than merging Thraupis into Tangara to create an unusually large genus with around 58 species, taxonomists chose to split off species from Tangara into four other genera. Two of these genera were newly erected (Stilpnia, Poecilostreptus) and two were resurrected: they had been introduced earlier but were not in use (Ixothraupis, Chalcothraupis).

The genus now contains the following 28 species:

Image	Common name	Scientific name	Distribution
	Blue-and-black tanager	Tangara vassorii	Bolivia, Colombia, Ecuador, Peru and Venezuela
	Beryl-spangled tanager	Tangara nigroviridis	Colombia through Ecuador and Peru to Bolivia
	Spangle-cheeked tanager	Tangara dowii	Costa Rica and western Panama
	Green-naped tanager	Tangara fucosa	Colombia and Panama
	Blue-browed tanager	Tangara cyanotis	Bolivia, Colombia, Ecuador, and Peru
	Rufous-cheeked tanager	Tangara rufigenis	Venezuela
	Metallic-green tanager	Tangara labradorides	Colombia, Ecuador, and Peru
	Bay-headed tanager	Tangara gyrola	Ecuador, Bolivia and southern Brazil, and on Trinidad
	Rufous-winged tanager	Tangara lavinia	Colombia, Costa Rica, Ecuador, Honduras, Nicaragua, and Panama
	Golden-eared tanager	Tangara chrysotis	eastern Andes of Bolivia, Colombia, Ecuador and Peru
	Saffron-crowned tanager	Tangara xanthocephala	northern Andes of Bolivia, Colombia, Ecuador, Peru, and Venezuela.
	Flame-faced tanager	Tangara parzudakii	eastern Andes of Colombia, Ecuador, Peru and Venezuela
	Blue-whiskered tanager	Tangara johannae	Colombia and Ecuador
	Green-and-gold tanager	Tangara schrankii	eastern Venezuela, Colombia, Ecuador, Peru, central Bolivia, and northwestern Brazil
	Golden tanager	Tangara arthus	Andes (from Bolivia and northwards) and Venezuelan Coastal Range in north-western South America
	Emerald tanager	Tangara florida	Colombia, Costa Rica, Ecuador, and Panama
	Silver-throated tanager	Tangara icterocephala	Costa Rica, through Panama and western Colombia, to western Ecuador.
	Seven-colored tanager	Tangara fastuosa	north-eastern Brazil
	Green-headed tanager	Tangara seledon	south-eastern Brazil, far eastern Paraguay, and far north-eastern Argentina
	Red-necked tanager	Tangara cyanocephala	Argentina, Brazil, and Paraguay
	Brassy-breasted tanager	Tangara desmaresti	Brazil
	Gilt-edged tanager	Tangara cyanoventris	Brazil
	Plain-colored tanager	Tangara inornata	Colombia, Costa Rica, and Panama
	Turquoise tanager	Tangara mexicana	Trinidad, Colombia and Venezuela south to Bolivia and much of Brazil
	White-bellied tanager	Tangara brasiliensis	east Brazil
	Paradise tanager	Tangara chilensis	western and northern Amazon Basin in South America (Venezuela, Peru, Colombia, Ecuador, Bolivia, Brazil and the Guianas)
	Opal-crowned tanager	Tangara callophrys	southern Colombia, eastern Ecuador and Peru, northwestern Bolivia, Amazonas state and Acre in Brazil
	Opal-rumped tanager	Tangara velia	Amazon and Atlantic Forest of South America

== Distribution and habitat ==
These tanagers are mainly found high in forest canopies, but some occupy more open habitat. They are found at all elevations below tree line but are most diverse in the Andean subtropical and foothill forests of Colombia, Ecuador and Peru.

== Behaviour and ecology ==
=== Breeding ===
The female builds a usually well concealed cup nest and lays two brown- or lilac-speckled white eggs. These hatch in 13–14 days and the chicks fledge in a further 15–16 days. The male and female feed the nestlings on insects and fruit, and may be assisted by helpers.

=== Food and feeding ===
Tangara tanagers pick insects from leaves, or sometimes in flight, but fruit is a major dietary item, accounting for 53-86% of food items in those species which have been studied.
