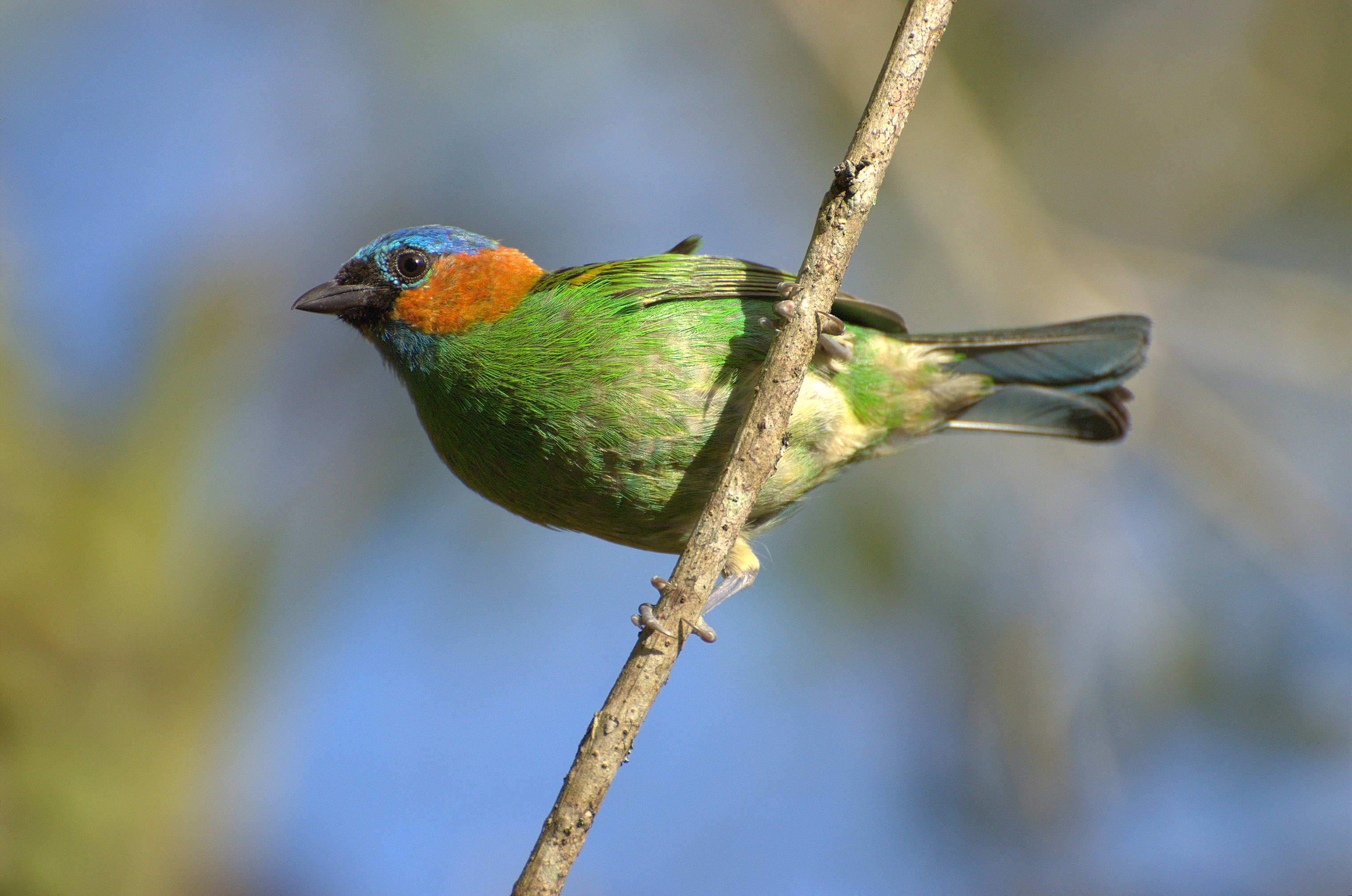

Conservation status
- Least Concern (IUCN 3.1)

Scientific classification
- Kingdom: Animalia
- Phylum: Chordata
- Class: Aves
- Order: Passeriformes
- Family: Thraupidae
- Genus: Tangara
- Species: T. cyanocephala

Binomial name
- Tangara cyanocephala (Müller, PLS, 1776)

= Red-necked tanager =

Species of bird

The red-necked tanager (Tangara cyanocephala) is a species of bird in the family Thraupidae.

It is found in Brazil, Argentina, and Paraguay. Its natural habitats are subtropical or tropical moist lowland forest and heavily degraded former forest.

== Taxonomy and systematics ==
The red-necked tanager was first described by Philipp Müller in 1776 as Tangara cyanocephala.

There are three recognised subspecies of the red-necked tanager:

- T. c. cearensis (Cory 1916) – differs from T. c. corallina "in having the crown darker and more purplish blue, the shorter upper tail coverts conspicuously tipped with bright light blue (forming a band about 5 mm. in width), pale blue separating the black of the forehead from the dark blue of the crown only slightly indicated, and size somewhat larger."
- T. c. corallina (Berlepsch 1903)
- T. c. cyanocephala (Müller 1776)

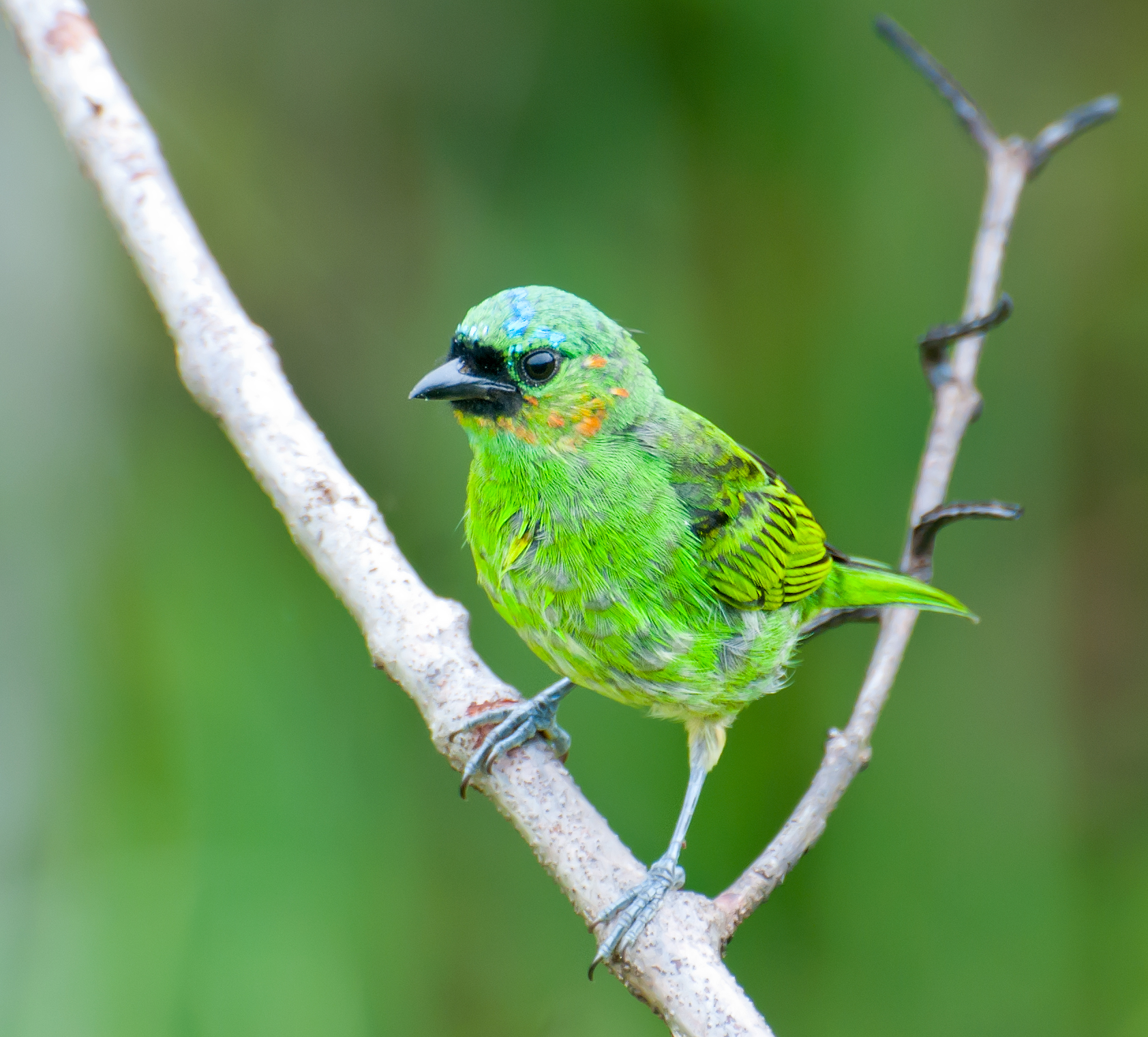
Juvenile in Brazil

== Description ==
It is mostly green with a black back and a blue head and throat. Plumage is described as "brilliant and varied, including areas of bright red, bright green, blue, and black." They can be observed in mixed-species flocks along with green-headed tanagers.
