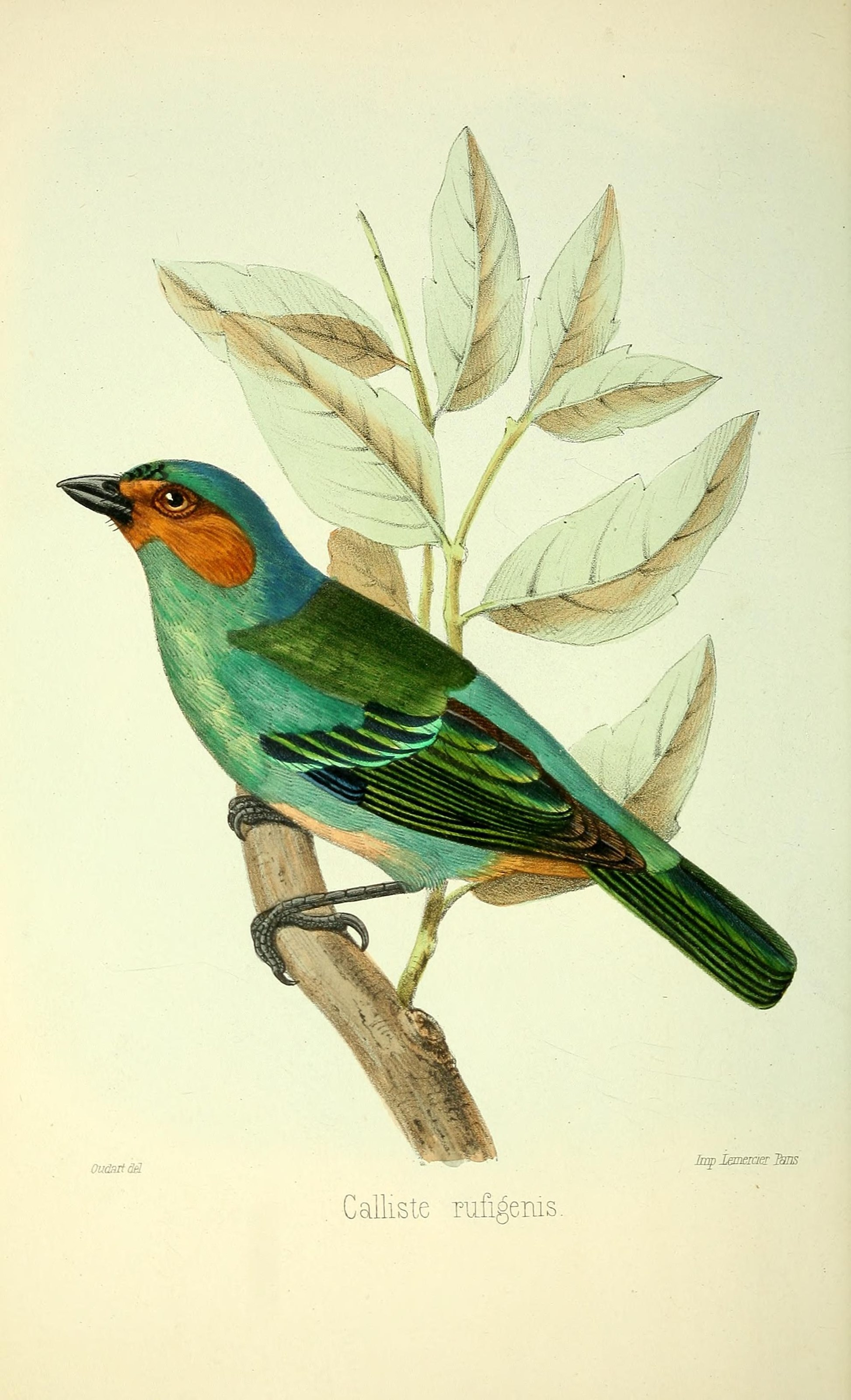

Conservation status
- Least Concern (IUCN 3.1)

Scientific classification
- Kingdom: Animalia
- Phylum: Chordata
- Class: Aves
- Order: Passeriformes
- Family: Thraupidae
- Genus: Tangara
- Species: T. rufigenis

Binomial name
- Tangara rufigenis (Sclater, PL, 1857)

= Rufous-cheeked tanager =

Species of bird

The rufous-cheeked tanager (Tangara rufigenis) is a species of bird in the family Thraupidae, the tanagers. It is endemic to Venezuela. Its natural habitat is subtropical or tropical moist montane forests.
