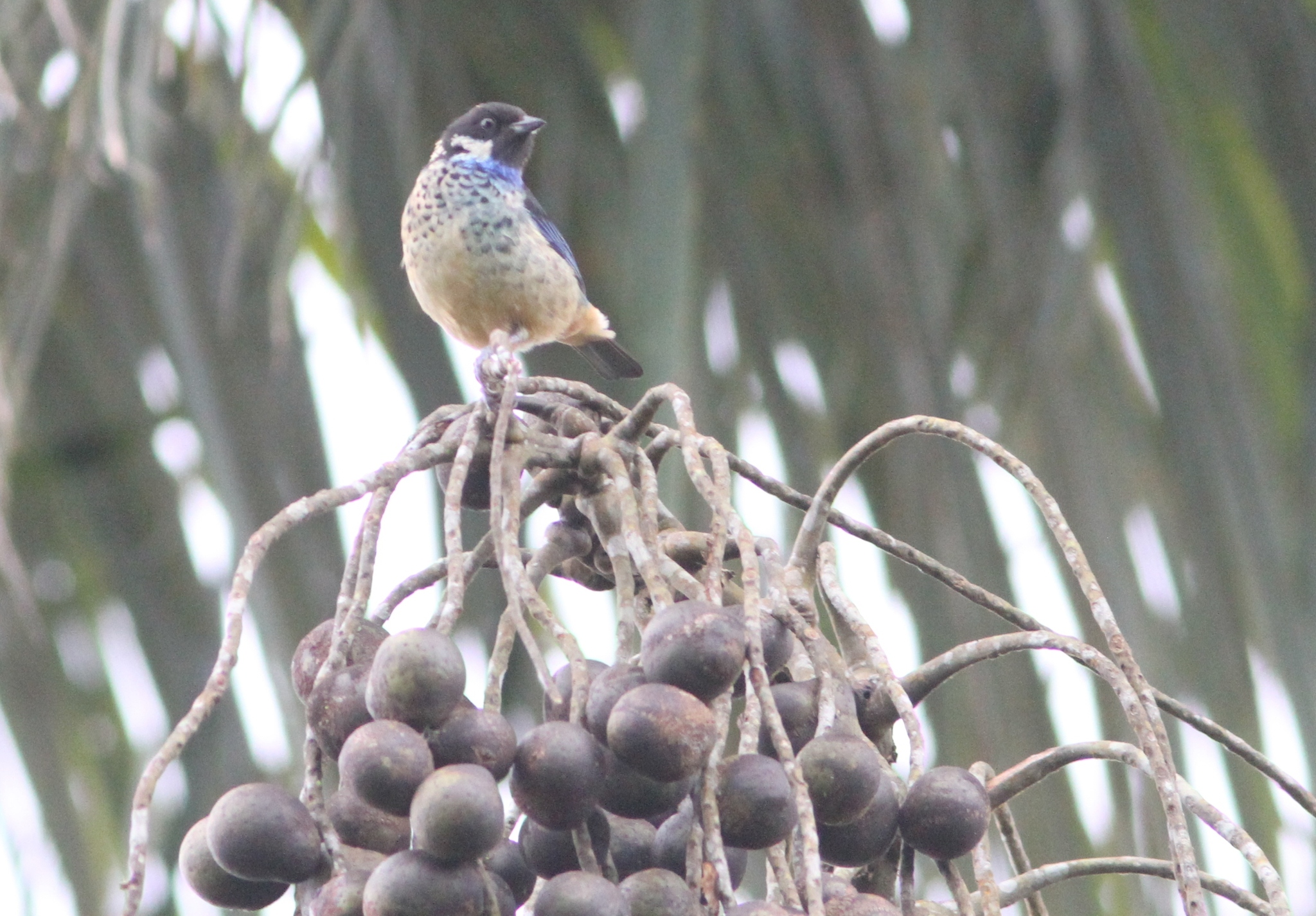

Conservation status
- Least Concern (IUCN 3.1)

Scientific classification
- Kingdom: Animalia
- Phylum: Chordata
- Class: Aves
- Order: Passeriformes
- Family: Thraupidae
- Genus: Tangara
- Species: T. fucosa

Binomial name
- Tangara fucosa Nelson, 1912

= Green-naped tanager =

Species of bird

The green-naped tanager (Tangara fucosa) is a species of bird in the family Thraupidae. It is found in the Serranía del Darién and Serranía del Baudó (Colombia and Panama). It is threatened by habitat loss.
