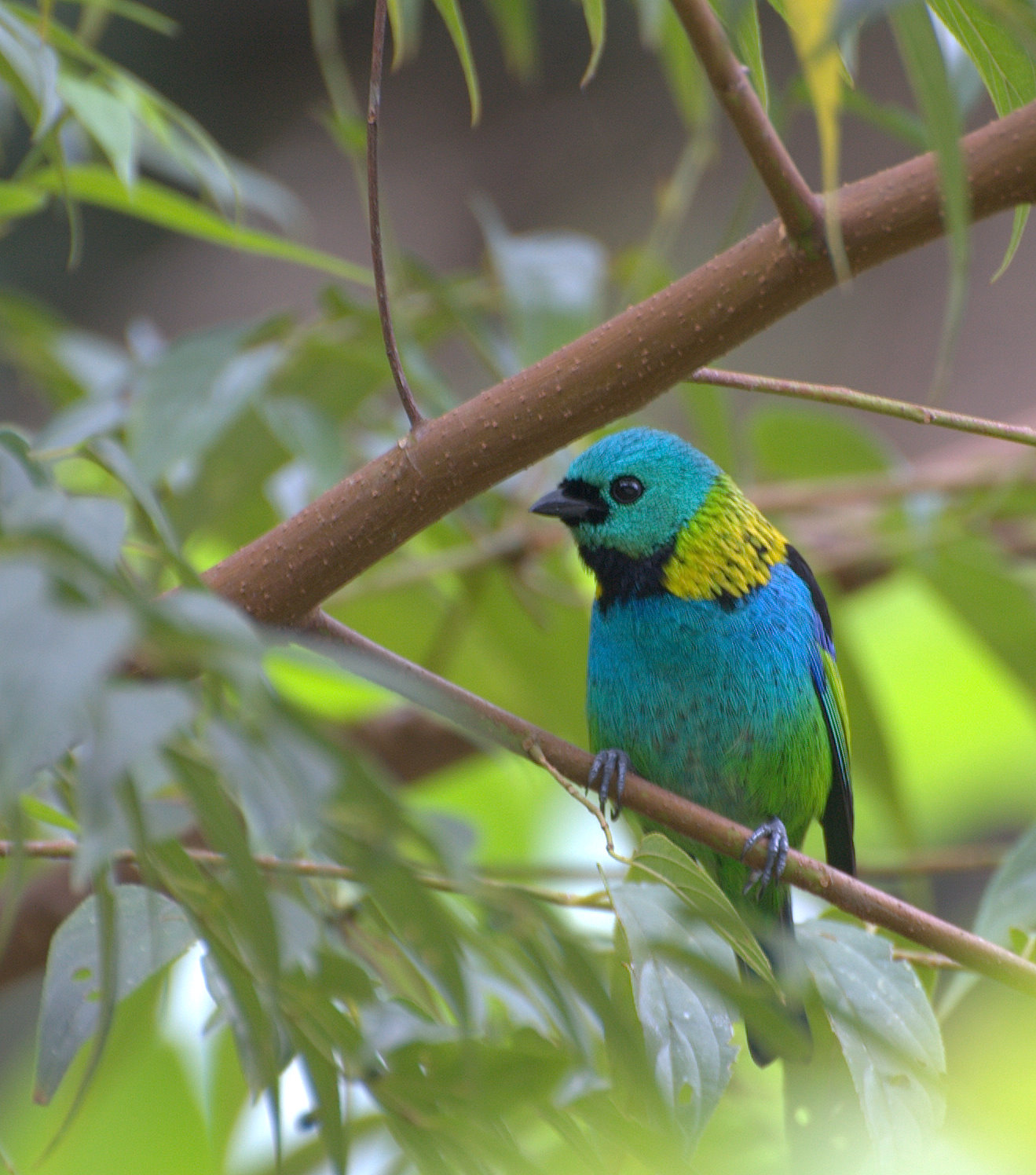

Conservation status
- Least Concern (IUCN 3.1)

Scientific classification
- Kingdom: Animalia
- Phylum: Chordata
- Class: Aves
- Order: Passeriformes
- Family: Thraupidae
- Genus: Tangara
- Species: T. seledon

Binomial name
- Tangara seledon (Müller, PLS, 1776)

= Green-headed tanager =

Species of bird

The green-headed tanager (Tangara seledon) is a brightly colored bird found in the Atlantic forest in south-eastern Brazil, far eastern Paraguay, and far north-eastern Argentina (Misiones only).

As other members of the genus Tangara, it is a small colorful bird, measuring an average of 13.5 centimeters (5.3 in) and a mass of 18g (0.6 oz). The green-headed Tanager has a greenish or bluish head, black on the back, and a contrastingly colored, orange or red rump. Females and juvenile birds have similar, though duller coloration. While essentially a bird of humid forests, it is also common in orchards and parks, where it moves through the canopy, making itself inconspicuous, as its apparently flashy blue-green coloration camouflages it well amongst the foliage.
