= List of birds of Mexico =

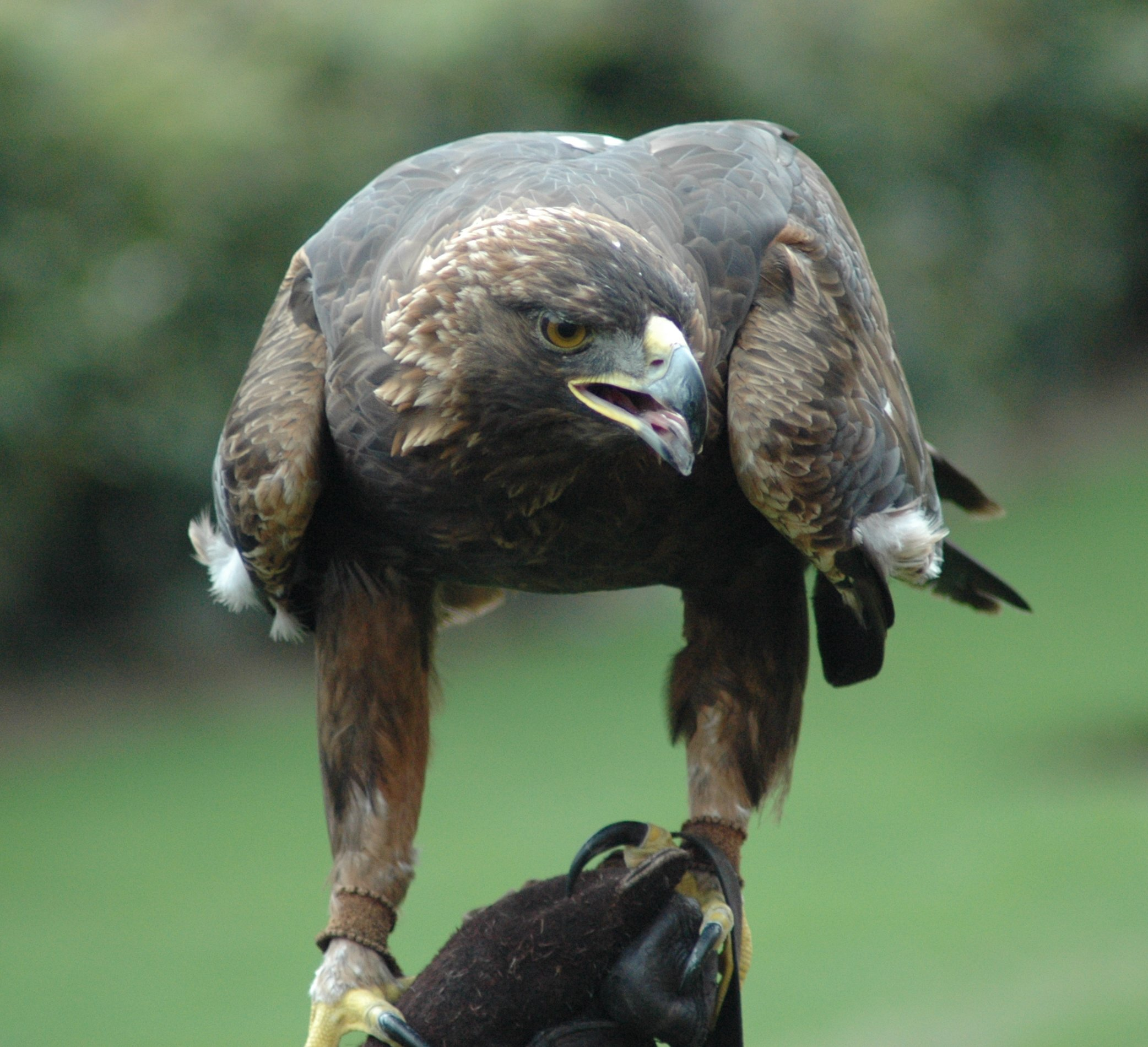
The golden eagle is Mexico's national bird.

This is a list of the bird species recorded in Mexico. The avifauna of Mexico included a total of 1136 species as of April 2024, according to Bird Checklists of the World. Of the 1135 species, 113 are rare or accidental, 11 have been introduced by humans, 112 are endemic, and five more breed only in Mexico though their non-breeding range is larger. Four species are known to be extinct, 68 are globally vulnerable or endangered, and three of the latter might also be extinct. The total figure includes a number of species which are known only from sight records; they are listed but not especially noted.

This list is presented in the taxonomic sequence of the Check-list of North and Middle American Birds, 7th edition through the 63rd Supplement, published by the American Ornithological Society (AOS). Common and scientific names are also those of the Check-list, except that the common names of families are from the Clements taxonomy because the AOS list does not include them.

Unless otherwise noted, the species on this list are considered to occur regularly in Mexico as permanent residents, summer or winter visitors, or migrants. The following tags have been used to highlight several categories. The tags and notes of population status are from Bird Checklists of the World.

- (A) Accidental - a species that rarely or accidentally occurs in Mexico
- (E) Endemic - a species endemic to Mexico
- (I) Introduced - a species introduced to Mexico as a consequence, direct or indirect, of human actions

== Tinamous ==
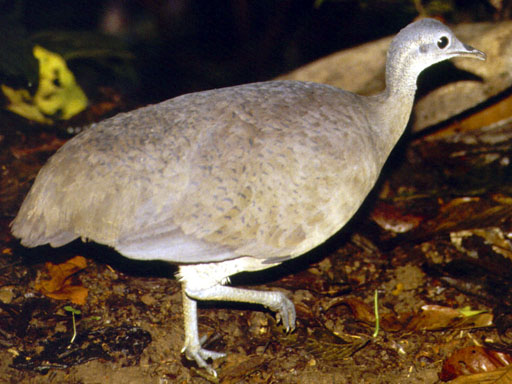
Two subspecies of great tinamou are found in southeastern Mexico.

Order: Tinamiformes Family: Tinamidae

The tinamous are one of the most ancient groups of bird. Although they look similar to other ground-dwelling birds like quail and grouse, they have no close relatives and are classified as a single family, Tinamidae, within their own order, the Tinamiformes. They are distantly related to the ratites (order Struthioniformes), that includes the rheas, emus, and kiwis.

- Great tinamou, Tinamus major (near-threatened)
- Little tinamou, Crypturellus soui
- Thicket tinamou, Crypturellus cinnamomeus
- Slaty-breasted tinamou, Crypturellus boucardi

== Ducks, geese, and waterfowl ==
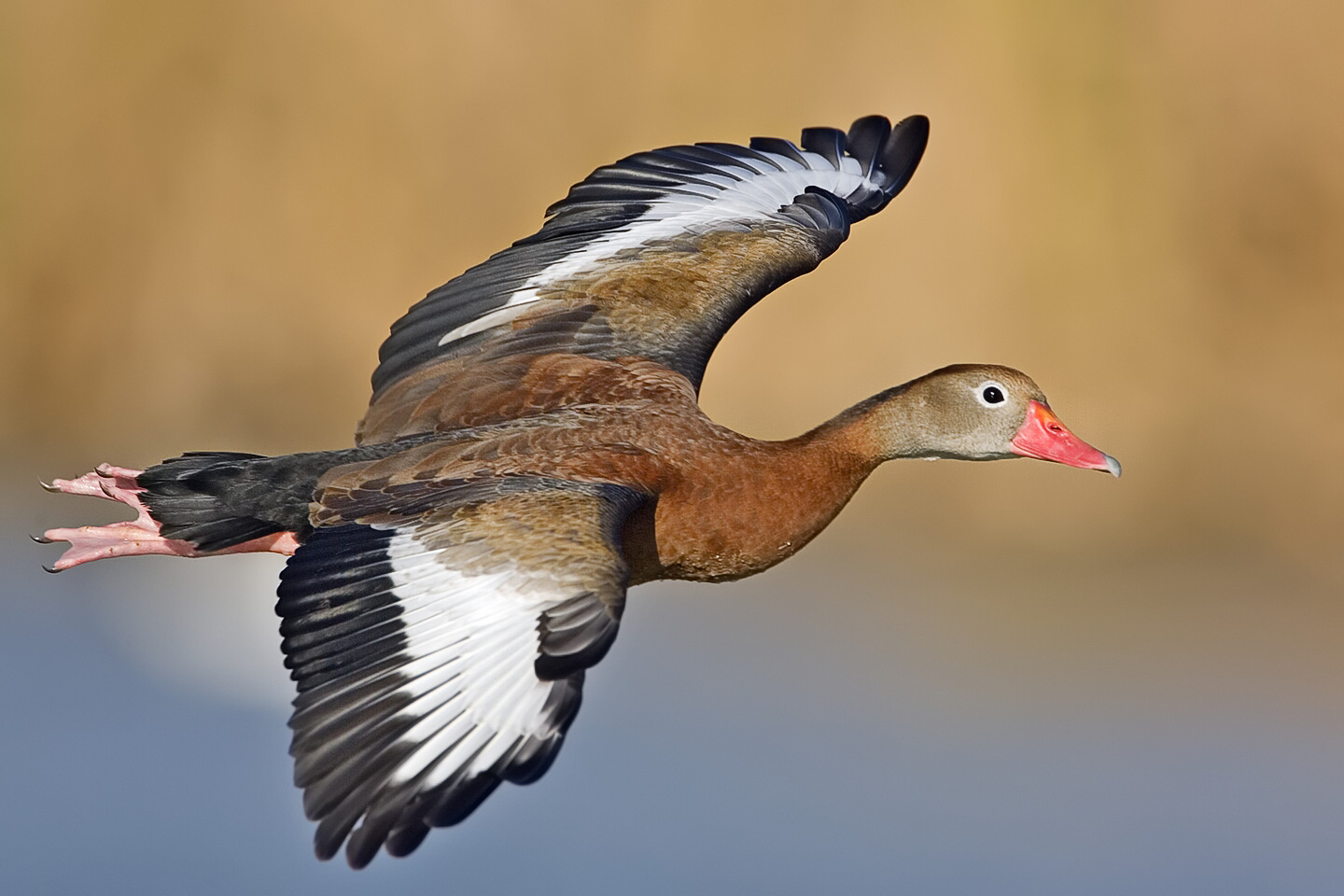
The black-bellied whistling-duck is common and widespread in Mexico.

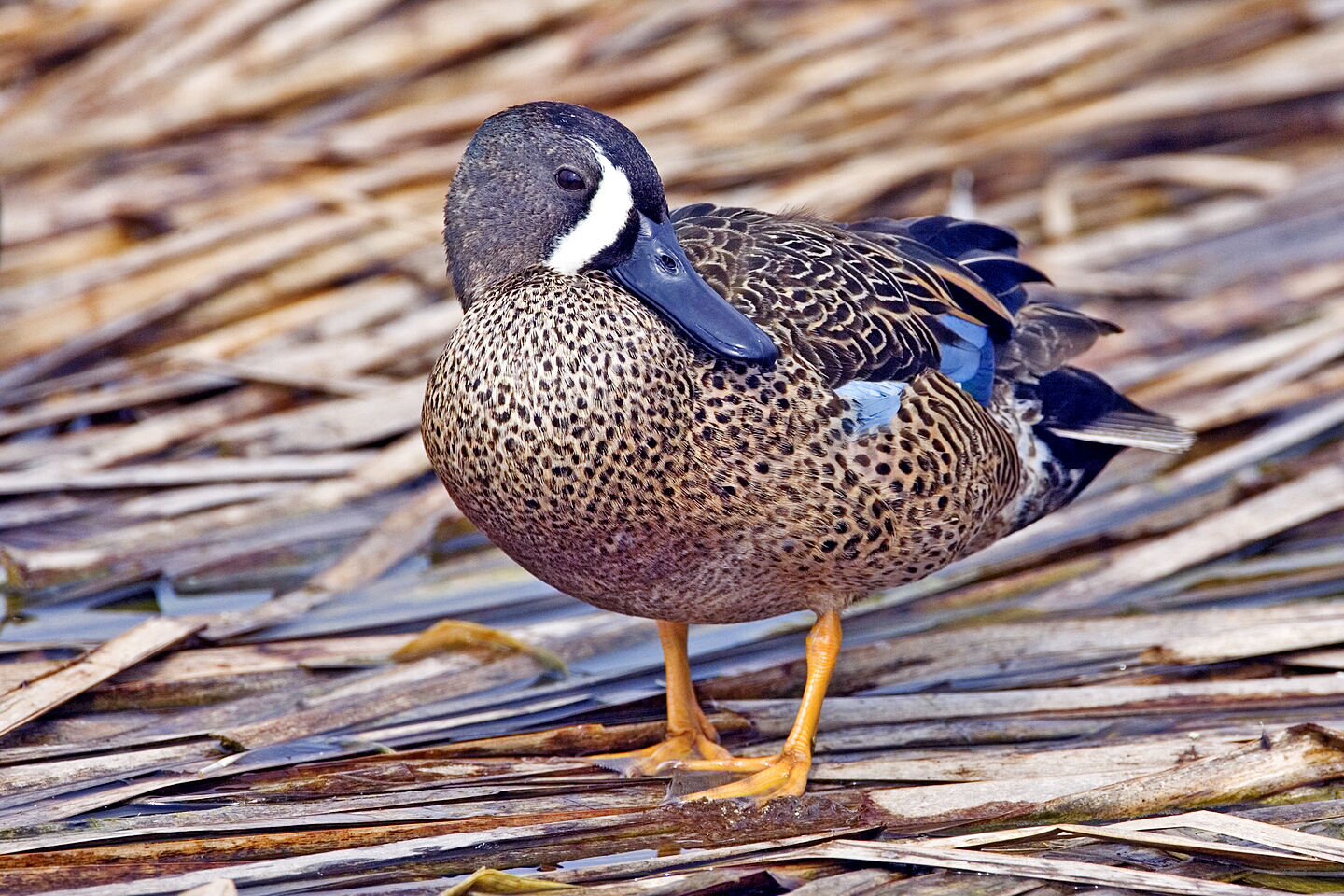
The blue-winged teal is a common winter visitor throughout the country.

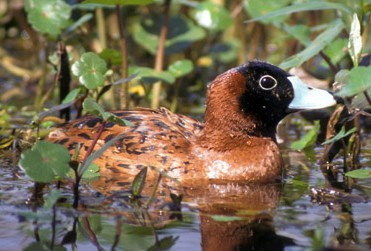
The masked duck is an uncommon to rare resident on both the Atlantic and Pacific slopes.

Order: Anseriformes Family: Anatidae

Anatidae includes the ducks and most duck-like waterfowl, such as geese and swans. These birds are adapted to an aquatic existence with webbed feet, flattened bills, and feathers that are excellent at shedding water due to an oily coating.

- Black-bellied whistling-duck, Dendrocygna autumnalis
- Fulvous whistling-duck, Dendrocygna bicolor
- Snow goose, Anser caerulescens
- Ross's goose, Anser rossii
- Greater white-fronted goose, Anser albifrons
- Brant, Branta bernicla
- Cackling goose, Branta hutchinsii
- Canada goose, Branta canadensis
- Trumpeter swan, Cygnus buccinator (A) (extirpated)
- Tundra swan, Cygnus columbianus
- Muscovy duck, Cairina moschata
- Wood duck, Aix sponsa
- Garganey, Spatula querquedula (A)
- Blue-winged teal, Spatula discors
- Cinnamon teal, Spatula cyanoptera
- Northern shoveler, Spatula clypeata
- Gadwall, Mareca strepera
- Eurasian wigeon, Mareca penelope
- American wigeon, Mareca americana
- Mallard, Anas platyrhynchos
- Mexican duck, Anas diazi
- Mottled duck, Anas fulvigula
- Northern pintail, Anas acuta
- Green-winged teal, Anas crecca
- Canvasback, Aythya valisineria
- Redhead, Aythya americana
- Ring-necked duck, Aythya collaris
- Greater scaup, Aythya marila
- Lesser scaup, Aythya affinis
- Harlequin duck, Histrionicus histrionicus (A)
- Surf scoter, Melanitta perspicillata
- White-winged scoter, Melanitta deglandi
- Black scoter, Melanitta americana (near-threatened)
- Long-tailed duck, Clangula hyemalis (A) (vulnerable)
- Bufflehead, Bucephala albeola
- Common goldeneye, Bucephala clangula
- Barrow's goldeneye, Bucephala islandica (A)
- Hooded merganser, Lophodytes cucullatus
- Common merganser, Mergus merganser
- Red-breasted merganser, Mergus serrator
- Masked duck, Nomonyx dominicus
- Ruddy duck, Oxyura jamaicensis

== Guans, chachalacas, and curassows ==
Order: Galliformes Family: Cracidae

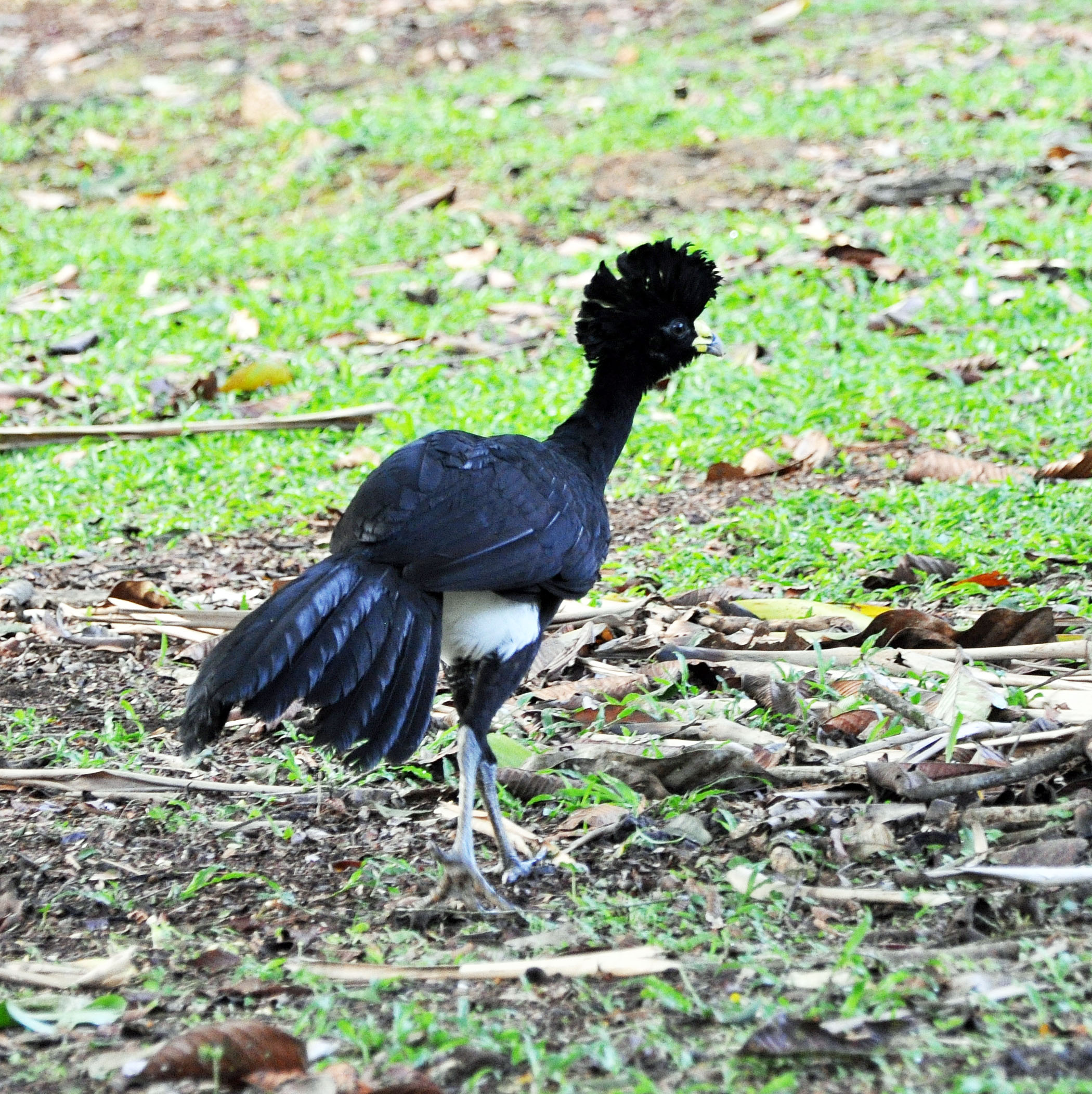
Great curassow

The Cracidae are large birds, similar in general appearance to turkeys. The guans and curassows live in trees, but the smaller chachalacas are found in more open scrubby habitats. They are generally dull-plumaged, but the curassows and some guans have colorful facial ornaments.

- Plain chachalaca, Ortalis vetula
- Rufous-bellied chachalaca, Ortalis wagleri (E)
- West Mexican chachalaca, Ortalis poliocephala (E)
- White-bellied chachalaca, Ortalis leucogastra
- Crested guan, Penelope purpurascens
- Highland guan, Penelopina nigra (vulnerable)
- Horned guan, Oreophasis derbianus (endangered)
- Great curassow, Crax rubra (vulnerable)

== New World quail ==
Order: Galliformes Family: Odontophoridae

The New World quail are small, plump terrestrial birds only distantly related to the quails of the Old World, but named for their similar appearance and habits. Mexico has the greatest diversity of this family of any country.

- Mountain quail, Oreortyx pictus
- Buffy-crowned wood-partridge, Dendrortyx leucophrys
- Long-tailed wood-partridge, Dendrortyx macroura (E)
- Bearded wood-partridge, Dendrortyx barbatus (E) (vulnerable)
- Banded quail, Philortyx fasciatus (E)
- Northern bobwhite, Colinus virginianus (near-threatened)
- Black-throated bobwhite, Colinus nigrogularis
- Scaled quail, Callipepla squamata
- Elegant quail, Callipepla douglasii (E)
- California quail, Callipepla californica
- Gambel's quail, Callipepla gambelii
- Montezuma quail, Cyrtonyx montezumae
- Ocellated quail, Cyrtonyx ocellatus (vulnerable)
- Singing quail, Dactylortyx thoracicus
- Spotted wood-quail, Odontophorus guttatus

== Pheasants, grouse, and allies ==
Order: Galliformes Family: Phasianidae

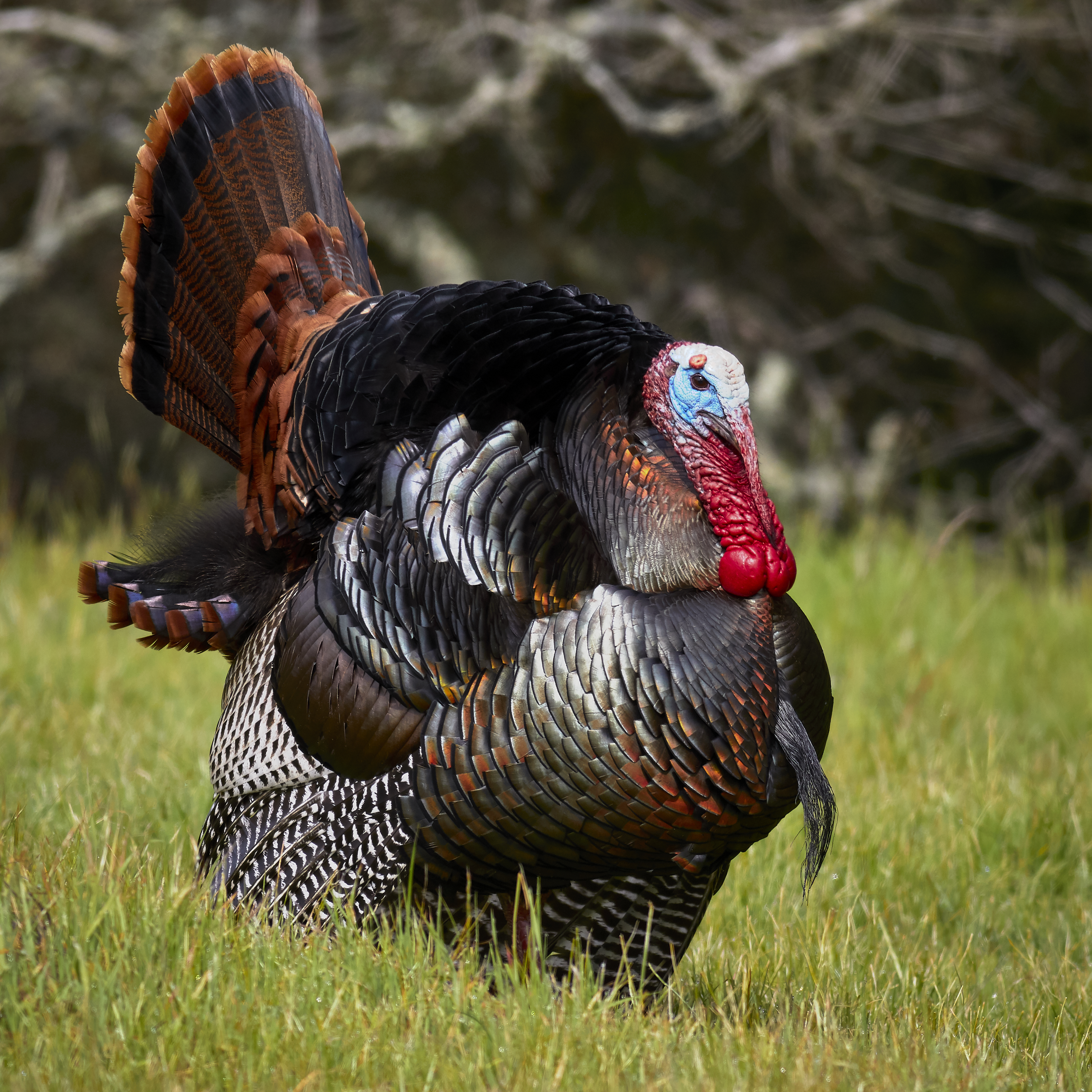
Wild turkey

Turkeys are similar to large pheasants but have a distinctive fleshy wattle that hangs from the beak, called a snood.

- Wild turkey, Meleagris gallopavo
- Ocellated turkey, Meleagris ocellata (near-threatened)
- Ring-necked pheasant, Phasianus colchicus (I)
- Chukar, Alectoris chukar (I)

== Flamingos ==
Order: Phoenicopteriformes Family: Phoenicopteridae

Flamingos are gregarious wading birds, usually 3 to 5 feet (0.9 to 1.5 m) tall, found in both the Western and Eastern Hemispheres. Flamingos filter-feed on shellfish and algae. Their oddly shaped beaks are specially adapted to separate mud and silt from the food they consume and, uniquely, are used upside-down.

- American flamingo, Phoenicopterus ruber

== Grebes ==
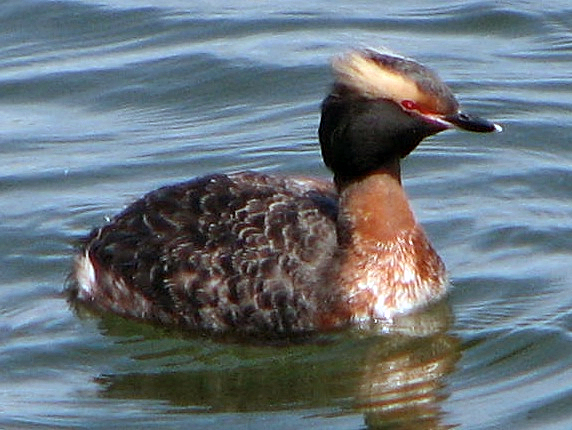
Horned grebe

Order: Podicipediformes Family: Podicipedidae

Grebes are small to medium-large freshwater diving birds. They have lobed toes and are excellent swimmers and divers. However, they have their feet placed far back on the body, making them quite ungainly on land.

- Least grebe, Tachybaptus dominicus
- Pied-billed grebe, Podilymbus podiceps
- Horned grebe, Podiceps auritus (vulnerable)
- Red-necked grebe, Podiceps grisegena (A)
- Eared grebe, Podiceps nigricollis
- Western grebe, Aechmophorus occidentalis
- Clark's grebe, Aechmophorus clarkii

== Pigeons and doves ==
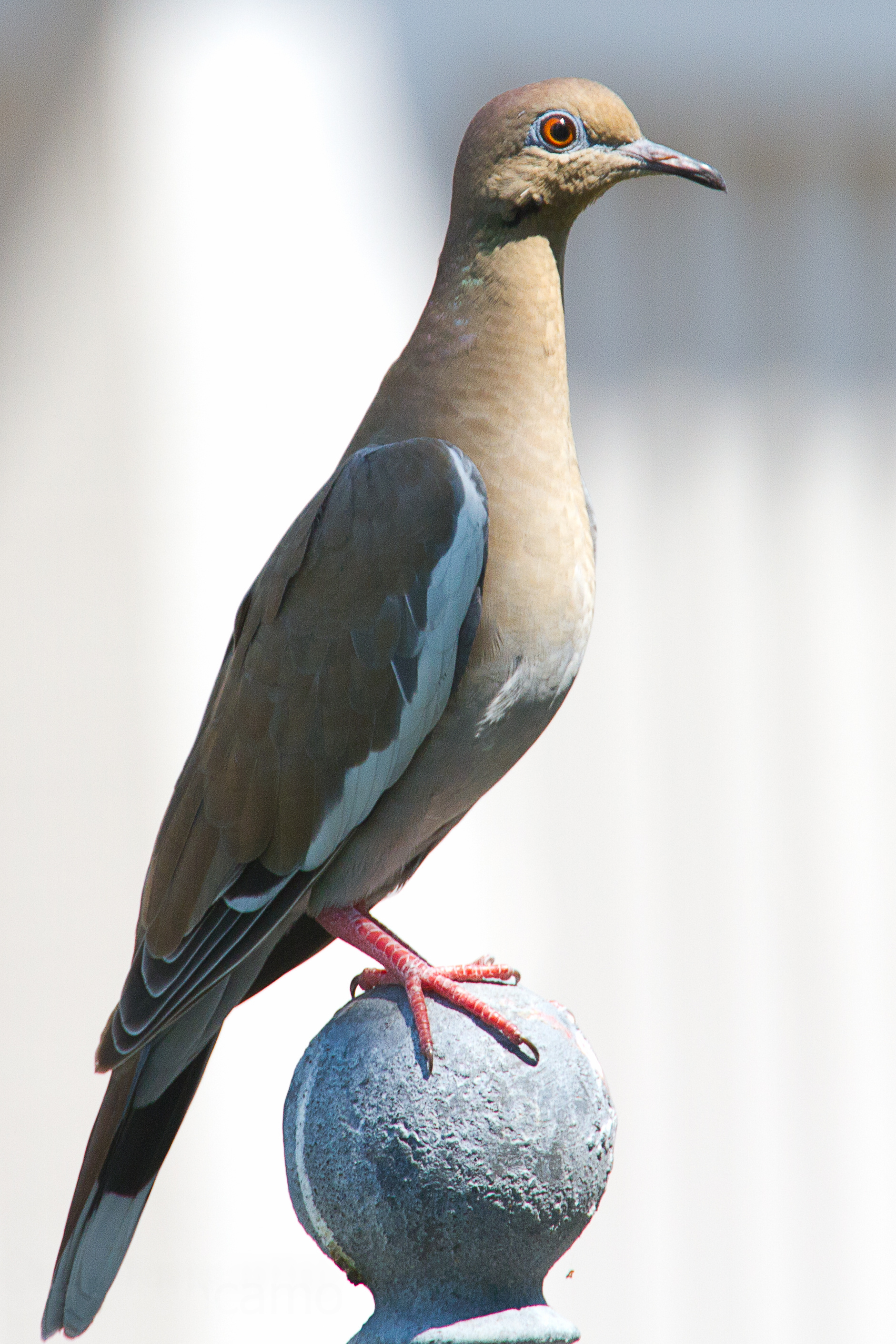
White-winged dove

Order: Columbiformes Family: Columbidae

Pigeons and doves are stout-bodied birds with short necks and short slender bills with a fleshy cere.

- Rock pigeon, Columba livia (I)
- Pale-vented pigeon, Patagioenas cayennensis
- Scaled pigeon, Patagioenas speciosa
- White-crowned pigeon, Patagioenas leucocephala (near-threatened)
- Red-billed pigeon, Patagioenas flavirostris
- Band-tailed pigeon, Patagioenas fasciata
- Short-billed pigeon, Patagioenas nigrirostris
- African collared-dove, Streptopelia roseogrisea (I)
- Eurasian collared-dove, Streptopelia decaocto (I)
- Spotted dove, Spilopelia chinensis (I)
- Passenger pigeon, Ectopistes migratorius (extinct)
- Inca dove, Columbina inca
- Common ground dove, Columbina passerina
- Plain-breasted ground dove, Columbina minuta
- Ruddy ground dove, Columbina talpacoti
- Blue ground dove, Claravis pretiosa
- Maroon-chested ground dove, Paraclaravis mondetoura
- Ruddy quail-dove, Geotrygon montana
- White-tipped dove, Leptotila verreauxi
- Caribbean dove, Leptotila jamaicensis
- Gray-chested dove, Leptotila cassinii
- Gray-headed dove, Leptotila plumbeiceps
- Tuxtla quail-dove, Zentrygon carrikeri (E) (endangered)
- White-faced quail-dove, Zentrygon albifacies
- White-winged dove, Zenaida asiatica
- Zenaida dove, Zenaida aurita
- Mourning dove, Zenaida macroura
- Socorro dove, Zenaida graysoni (E) (extinct in the wild)

== Cuckoos ==
Order: Cuculiformes Family: Cuculidae

The family Cuculidae includes cuckoos, roadrunners, and anis. These birds are of variable size with slender bodies, long tails, and strong legs.

- Smooth-billed ani, Crotophaga ani
- Groove-billed ani, Crotophaga sulcirostris
- Striped cuckoo, Tapera naevia
- Pheasant cuckoo, Dromococcyx phasianellus
- Lesser ground-cuckoo, Morococcyx erythropygus
- Lesser roadrunner, Geococcyx velox
- Greater roadrunner, Geococcyx californianus
- Squirrel cuckoo, Piaya cayana
- Yellow-billed cuckoo, Coccyzus americanus
- Mangrove cuckoo, Coccyzus minor
- Black-billed cuckoo, Coccyzus erythropthalmus

== Nightjars and allies ==
Order: Caprimulgiformes Family: Caprimulgidae

Nightjars are medium-sized nocturnal birds that usually nest on the ground. They have long wings, short legs, and very short bills. Most have small feet, of little use for walking, and long pointed wings. Their soft plumage is camouflaged to resemble bark or leaves.

- Short-tailed nighthawk, Lurocalis semitorquatus
- Lesser nighthawk, Chordeiles acutipennis
- Common nighthawk, Chordeiles minor
- Common pauraque, Nyctidromus albicollis
- Common poorwill, Phalaenoptilus nuttallii
- Eared poorwill, Nyctiphrynus mcleodii (E)
- Yucatan poorwill, Nyctiphrynus yucatanicus
- Chuck-will's-widow, Antrostomus carolinensis (near-threatened)
- Tawny-collared nightjar, Antrostomus salvini (E)
- Yucatan nightjar, Antrostomus badius
- Buff-collared nightjar, Antrostomus ridgwayi
- Eastern whip-poor-will, Antrostomus vociferus (near-threatened)
- Mexican whip-poor-will, Antrostomus arizonae
- Spot-tailed nightjar, Hydropsalis maculicaudus

== Potoos ==
Order: Nyctibiiformes Family: Nyctibiidae

The potoos (sometimes called poor-me-ones) are large near passerine birds related to the nightjars and frogmouths. They are nocturnal insectivores which lack the bristles around the mouth found in the true nightjars.

- Great potoo, Nyctibius grandis
- Northern potoo, Nyctibius jamaicensis

== Swifts ==
Order: Apodiformes Family: Apodidae

Swifts are small birds which spend the majority of their lives flying. These birds have very short legs and never settle voluntarily on the ground, perching instead only on vertical surfaces. Many swifts have long swept-back wings which resemble a crescent or boomerang.

- Black swift, Cypseloides niger (vulnerable)
- White-fronted swift, Cypseloides storeri (E) (data deficient)
- Chestnut-collared swift, Streptoprocne rutila
- White-collared swift, Streptoprocne zonaris
- White-naped swift, Streptoprocne semicollaris (E)
- Chimney swift, Chaetura pelagica (vulnerable)
- Vaux's swift, Chaetura vauxi
- White-throated swift, Aeronautes saxatalis
- Lesser swallow-tailed swift, Panyptila cayennensis
- Great swallow-tailed swift, Panyptila sanctihieronymi

== Hummingbirds ==
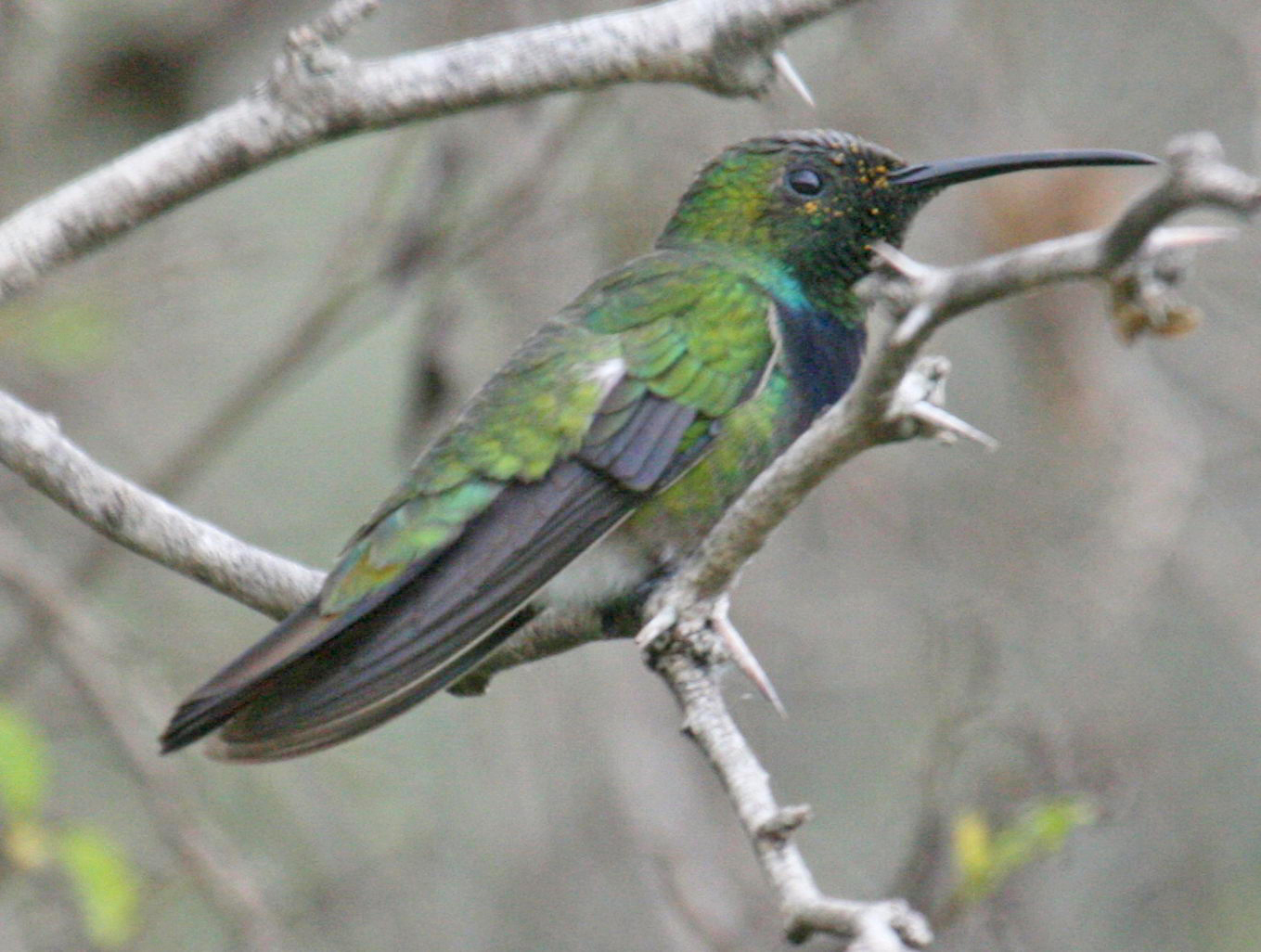
Green-breasted mango

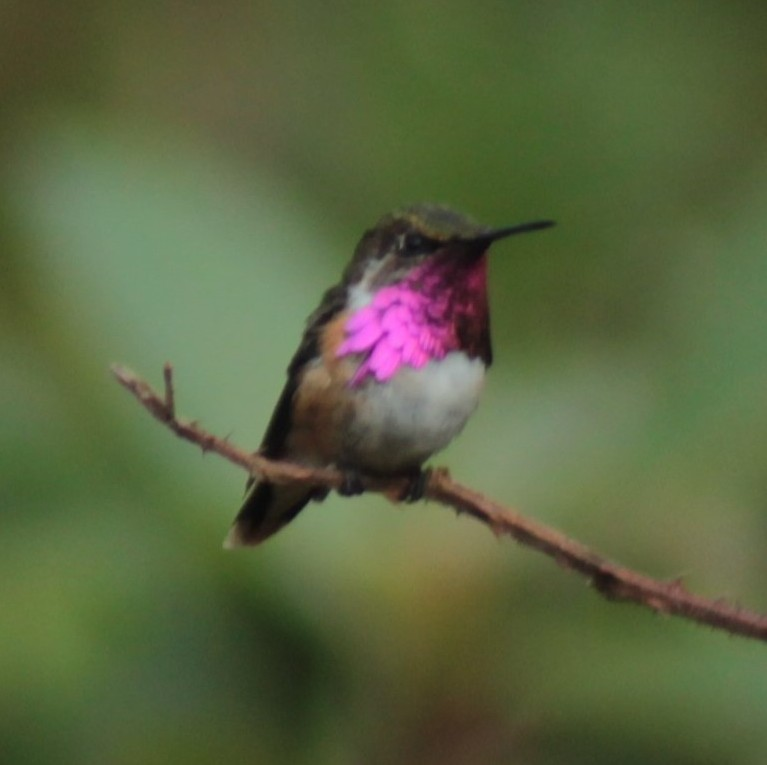
Wine-throated hummingbird

Order: Apodiformes Family: Trochilidae

Hummingbirds are small birds capable of hovering in mid-air due to the rapid flapping of their wings. They are the only birds that can fly backwards.

- White-necked jacobin, Florisuga mellivora
- Mexican hermit, Phaethornis mexicanus
- Long-billed hermit, Phaethornis longirostris
- Stripe-throated hermit, Phaethornis striigularis
- Mexican violetear, Colibri thalassinus
- Purple-crowned fairy, Heliothryx barroti
- Green-breasted mango, Anthracothorax prevostii
- Short-crested coquette, Lophornis brachylophus (E) (critically endangered)
- Black-crested coquette, Lophornis helenae
- Rivoli's hummingbird, Eugenes fulgens
- Long-billed starthroat, Heliomaster longirostris
- Plain-capped starthroat, Heliomaster constantii
- Green-throated mountain-gem, Lampornis viridipallens
- Amethyst-throated mountain-gem, Lampornis amethystinus
- Blue-throated mountain-gem, Lampornis clemenciae
- Garnet-throated hummingbird, Lamprolaima rhami
- Slender sheartail, Doricha enicura
- Mexican sheartail, Doricha eliza (E) (near-threatened)
- Sparkling-tailed hummingbird, Tilmatura dupontii
- Lucifer hummingbird, Calothorax lucifer
- Beautiful hummingbird, Calothorax pulcher (E)
- Ruby-throated hummingbird, Archilochus colubris
- Black-chinned hummingbird, Archilochus alexandri
- Anna's hummingbird, Calypte anna
- Costa's hummingbird, Calypte costae
- Bumblebee hummingbird, Atthis heloisa (E)
- Wine-throated hummingbird, Atthis ellioti
- Calliope hummingbird, Selasphorus calliope
- Rufous hummingbird, Selasphorus rufus (near-threatened)
- Allen's hummingbird, Selasphorus sasin
- Broad-tailed hummingbird, Selasphorus platycercus
- Dusky hummingbird, Phaeoptila sordidus (E)
- Broad-billed hummingbird, Cynanthus latirostris
- Tres Marias hummingbird, Cynanthus lawrencei (E)
- Golden-crowned emerald, Cynanthus auriceps (E)
- Turquoise-crowned hummingbird, Cynanthus doubledayi (E)
- Cozumel emerald, Cynanthus forficatus (E)
- Canivet's emerald, Cynanthus canivetii
- White-eared hummingbird, Basilinna leucotis
- Xantus's hummingbird, Basilinna xantusii (E)
- Wedge-tailed sabrewing, Pampa curvipennis
- Long-tailed sabrewing, Pampa excellens (E)
- Rufous sabrewing, Pampa rufa
- Emerald-chinned hummingbird, Abeillia abeillei
- Violet sabrewing, Campylopterus hemileucurus
- Mexican woodnymph, Eupherusa ridgwayi (E) (vulnerable)
- White-tailed hummingbird, Eupherusa poliocerca (E) (vulnerable)
- Blue-capped hummingbird, Eupherusa cyanophrys (E) (endangered)
- Stripe-tailed hummingbird, Eupherusa eximia
- Scaly-breasted hummingbird, Phaeochroa cuvierii
- Violet-crowned hummingbird, Ramosomyia violiceps
- Green-fronted hummingbird, Ramosomyia viridifrons
- Azure-crowned hummingbird, Saucerottia cyanocephala
- Berylline hummingbird, Saucerottia beryllina
- Blue-tailed hummingbird, Saucerottia cyanura
- Cinnamon hummingbird, Amazilia rutila
- Buff-bellied hummingbird, Amazilia yucatanensis
- Rufous-tailed hummingbird, Amazilia tzacatl
- White-bellied emerald, Chlorestes candida
- Blue-throated goldentail, Chlorestes eliciae

== Rails, gallinules, and coots ==
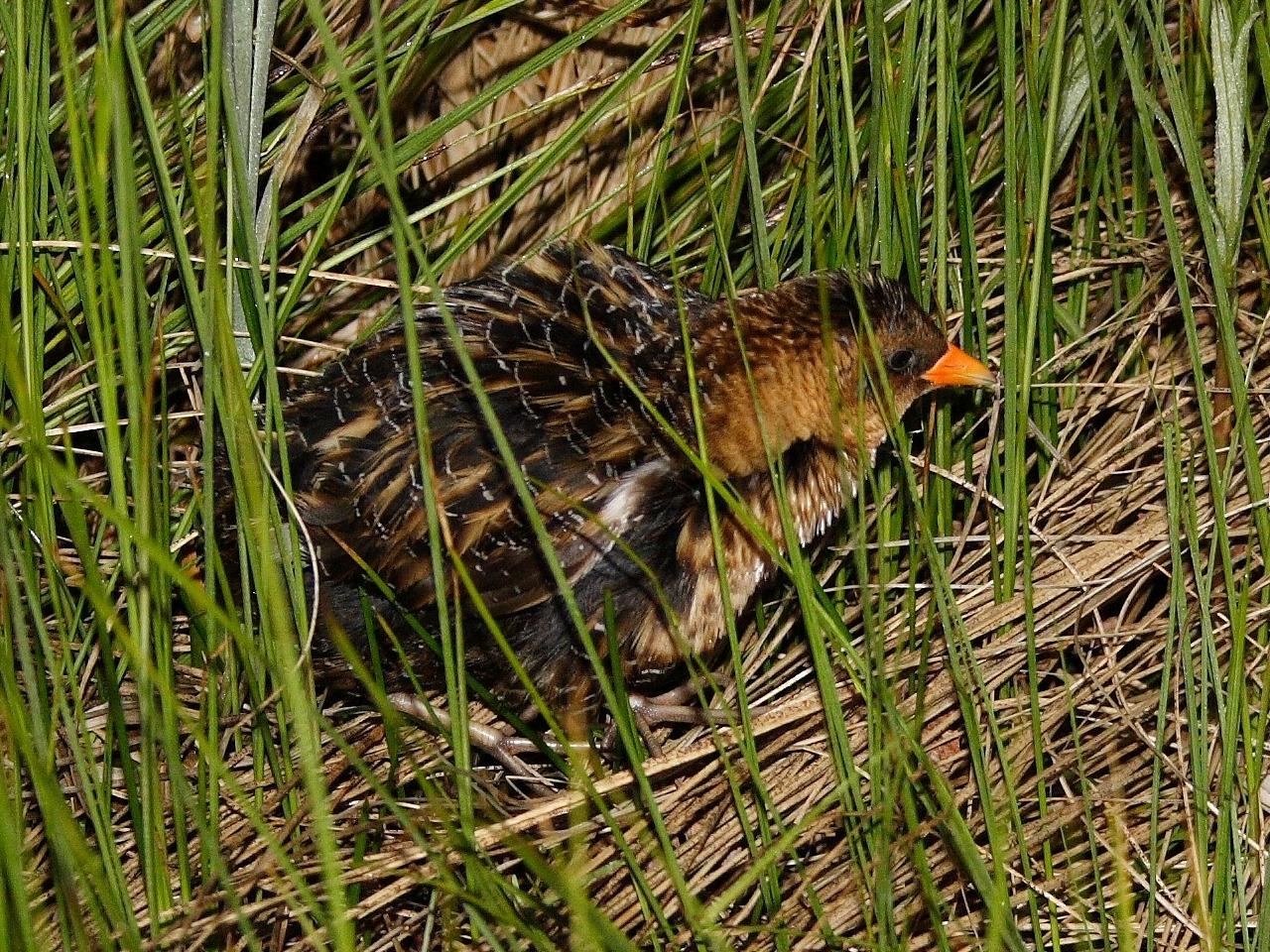
Yellow rail

Order: Gruiformes Family: Rallidae

Rallidae is a large family of small to medium-sized birds which includes the rails, crakes, coots, and gallinules. Typically they inhabit dense vegetation in damp environments near lakes, swamps, or rivers. In general they are shy and secretive birds, making them difficult to observe. Most species have strong legs and long toes which are well adapted to soft uneven surfaces. They tend to have short, rounded wings and to be weak fliers.

- Spotted rail, Pardirallus maculatus
- Uniform crake, Amaurolimnas concolor
- Rufous-necked wood-rail, Aramides axillaris
- Russet-naped wood-rail, Aramides albiventris
- Ridgway's rail, Rallus obsoletus (near-threatened)
- Clapper rail, Rallus crepitans
- Aztec rail, Rallus tenuirostris (E) (near-threatened)
- King rail, Rallus elegans (near-threatened)
- Virginia rail, Rallus limicola
- Sora, Porzana carolina
- Common gallinule, Gallinula galeata
- American coot, Fulica americana (A)
- Purple gallinule, Porphyrio martinicus
- Yellow rail, Coturnicops noveboracensis (A) (extirpated)
  - C. n. goldmani possibly extinct
- Yellow-breasted crake, Hapalocrex flaviventer
- Ruddy crake, Laterallus ruber
- Gray-breasted crake, Laterallus exilis
- Black rail, Laterallus jamaicensis

== Finfoots ==
Order: Gruiformes Family: Heliornithidae

Heliornithidae is a small family of tropical birds with webbed lobes on their feet similar to those of grebes and coots.

- Sungrebe, Heliornis fulica

== Limpkin ==
Order: Gruiformes Family: Aramidae

The limpkin resembles a large rail. It has drab-brown plumage and a grayer head and neck.

- Limpkin, Aramus guarauna

== Cranes ==
Order: Gruiformes Family: Gruidae

Cranes are large, long-legged, and long-necked birds. Unlike the similar-looking but unrelated herons, cranes fly with necks outstretched, not pulled back. Most have elaborate and noisy courting displays or "dances".

- Sandhill crane, Antigone canadensis
- Whooping crane, Grus americana (A) (endangered) (extirpated)

== Thick-knees ==
Order: Charadriiformes Family: Burhinidae

The thick-knees are a group of largely tropical waders in the family Burhinidae. They are found worldwide within the tropical zone, with some species also breeding in temperate Europe and Australia. They are medium to large waders with strong black or yellow-black bills, large yellow eyes, and cryptic plumage. Despite being classed as waders, most species have a preference for arid or semi-arid habitats.

- Double-striped thick-knee, Burhinus bistriatus

== Stilts and avocets ==
Order: Charadriiformes Family: Recurvirostridae

Recurvirostridae is a family of large wading birds which includes the avocets and stilts. The avocets have long legs and long up-curved bills. The stilts have extremely long legs and long, thin, straight bills.

- Black-necked stilt, Himantopus mexicanus
- American avocet, Recurvirostra americana

== Oystercatchers ==
Order: Charadriiformes Family: Haematopodidae

The oystercatchers are large and noisy plover-like birds with strong bills used for smashing or prying open molluscs.

- American oystercatcher, Haematopus palliatus
- Black oystercatcher, Haematopus bachmani

== Plovers and lapwings ==
Order: Charadriiformes Family: Charadriidae

The family Charadriidae includes the plovers, dotterels, and lapwings. They are small to medium-sized birds with compact bodies, short thick necks, and long, usually pointed, wings. They are found in open country worldwide, mostly in habitats near water.

- Southern lapwing, Vanellus chilensis (A)
- Black-bellied plover, Pluvialis squatarola
- American golden-plover, Pluvialis dominica
- Pacific golden-plover, Pluvialis fulva
- Eurasian dotterel, Charadrius morinellus (A)
- Killdeer, Charadrius vociferus
- Semipalmated plover, Charadrius semipalmatus
- Piping plover, Charadrius melodus (near-threatened)
- Wilson's plover, Charadrius wilsonia
- Collared plover, Charadrius collaris
- Snowy plover, Charadrius nivosus (near-threatened)
- Mountain plover, Charadrius montanus (near-threatened)

== Jacanas ==
Order: Charadriiformes Family: Jacanidae

The jacanas are a family of waders which are found throughout the tropics. They are identifiable by their huge feet and claws which enable them to walk on floating vegetation in the shallow lakes that are their preferred habitat.

- Northern jacana, Jacana spinosa

== Sandpipers and allies ==
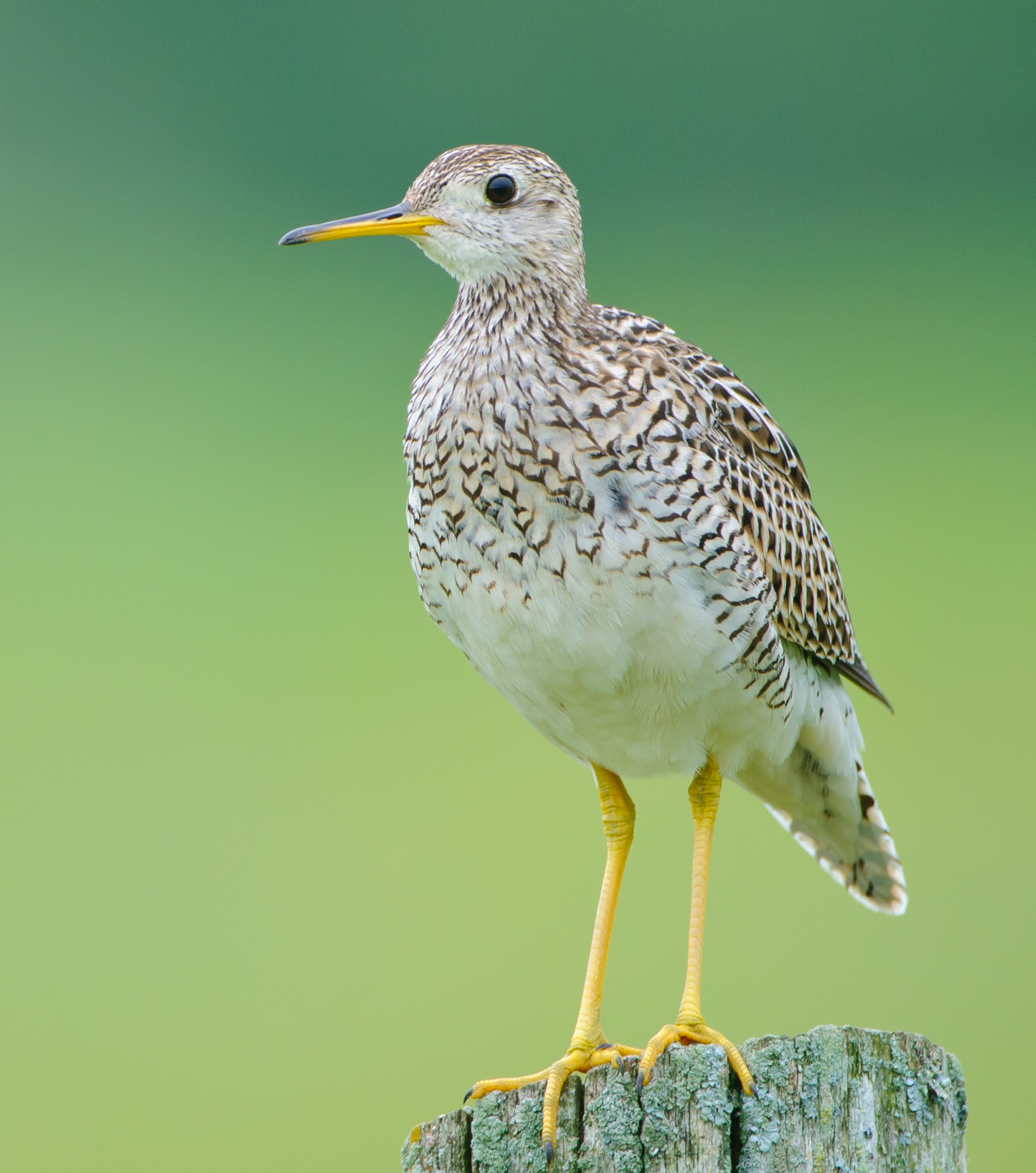
Upland sandpiper

Order: Charadriiformes Family: Scolopacidae

Scolopacidae is a large diverse family of small to medium-sized shorebirds including the sandpipers, curlews, godwits, shanks, tattlers, woodcocks, snipes, dowitchers, and phalaropes. The majority of these species eat small invertebrates picked out of the mud or soil. Variation in length of legs and bills enables multiple species to feed in the same habitat, particularly on the coast, without direct competition for food.

- Upland sandpiper, Bartramia longicauda
- Whimbrel, Numenius phaeopus
- Eskimo curlew, Numenius borealis (A) (critically endangered, possibly extinct)
- Long-billed curlew, Numenius americanus
- Bar-tailed godwit, Limosa lapponica (A) (near-threatened)
- Hudsonian godwit, Limosa haemastica (A)
- Marbled godwit, Limosa fedoa
- Ruddy turnstone, Arenaria interpres
- Black turnstone, Arenaria melanocephala
- Red knot, Calidris canutus (near-threatened)
- Surfbird, Calidris virgata
- Ruff, Calidris pugnax (A)
- Sharp-tailed sandpiper, Calidris acuminata (A)
- Stilt sandpiper, Calidris himantopus
- Curlew sandpiper, Calidris ferruginea (A) (near-threatened)
- Sanderling, Calidris alba
- Dunlin, Calidris alpina
- Purple sandpiper, Calidris maritima (A)
- Baird's sandpiper, Calidris bairdii
- Little stint, Calidris minuta (A)
- Least sandpiper, Calidris minutilla
- White-rumped sandpiper, Calidris fuscicollis
- Buff-breasted sandpiper, Calidris subruficollis (near-threatened)
- Pectoral sandpiper, Calidris melanotos
- Semipalmated sandpiper, Calidris pusilla (near-threatened)
- Western sandpiper, Calidris mauri
- Short-billed dowitcher, Limnodromus griseus
- Long-billed dowitcher, Limnodromus scolopaceus
- American woodcock, Scolopax minor (A)
- Wilson's snipe, Gallinago delicata
- Terek sandpiper, Xenus cinereus (A)
- Spotted sandpiper, Actitis macularia
- Solitary sandpiper, Tringa solitaria
- Wandering tattler, Tringa incana
- Lesser yellowlegs, Tringa flavipes
- Willet, Tringa semipalmata
- Greater yellowlegs, Tringa melanoleuca
- Wood sandpiper, Tringa glareola (A)
- Marsh sandpiper, Tringa stagnatilis (A)
- Wilson's phalarope, Phalaropus tricolor
- Red-necked phalarope, Phalaropus lobatus
- Red phalarope, Phalaropus fulicarius

== Skuas and jaegers ==
Order: Charadriiformes Family: Stercorariidae

The family Stercorariidae are, in general, medium to large birds, typically with gray or brown plumage, often with white markings on the wings. They nest on the ground in temperate and arctic regions and are long-distance migrants.

- South polar skua, Stercorarius maccormicki
- Pomarine jaeger, Stercorarius pomarinus
- Parasitic jaeger, Stercorarius parasiticus
- Long-tailed jaeger, Stercorarius longicaudus

== Auks, murres, and puffins ==
Order: Charadriiformes Family: Alcidae

Alcids are superficially similar to penguins due to their black-and-white colors, their upright posture, and some of their habits. However, they are not related to the penguins and differ in being able to fly. Auks live on the open sea, only deliberately coming ashore to nest.

- Common murre, Uria aalge
- Pigeon guillemot, Cepphus columba (A)
- Marbled murrelet, Brachyramphus marmoratus (A) (endangered)
- Scripps's murrelet, Synthliboramphus scrippsi (vulnerable)
- Guadalupe murrelet, Synthliboramphus hypoleucus (endangered)
- Craveri's murrelet, Synthliboramphus craveri (breeding endemic) (vulnerable)
- Ancient murrelet, Synthliboramphus antiquus (A)
- Cassin's auklet, Ptychoramphus aleuticus (near-threatened)
- Parakeet auklet, Aethia psittacula (A)
- Crested auklet, Aethia cristatella (A)
- Rhinoceros auklet, Cerorhinca monocerata

== Gulls, terns, and skimmers ==
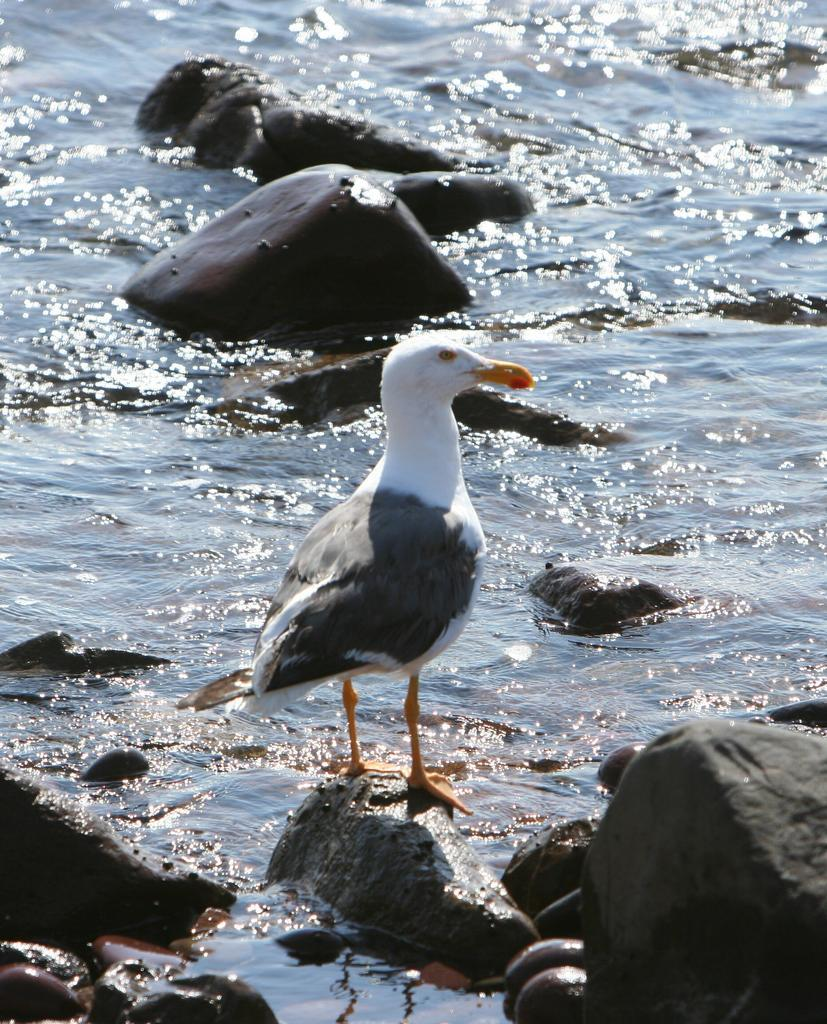
Yellow-footed gull

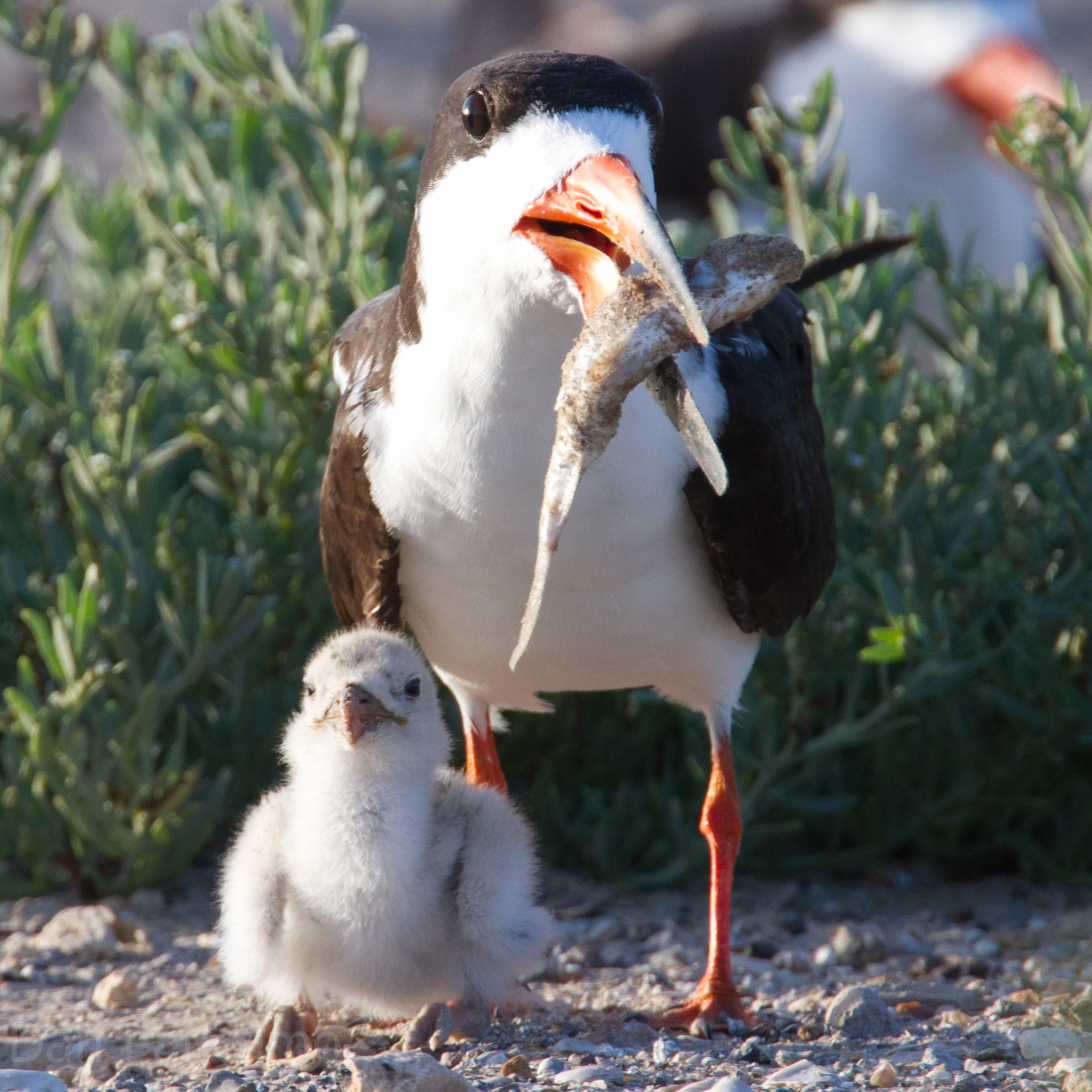
Black skimmers

Order: Charadriiformes Family: Laridae

Laridae is a family of medium to large seabirds and includes gulls, kittiwakes, terns, and skimmers. They are typically gray or white, often with black markings on the head or wings. They have longish bills and webbed feet. Terns are a group of generally medium to large seabirds typically with gray or white plumage, often with black markings on the head. Most terns hunt fish by diving but some pick insects off the surface of fresh water. Terns are generally long-lived birds, with several species known to live in excess of 30 years. Skimmers are a small family of tropical tern-like birds. They have an elongated lower mandible which they use to feed by flying low over the water surface and skimming the water for small fish.

- Swallow-tailed gull, Creagrus furcatus (A)
- Black-legged kittiwake, Rissa tridactyla
- Sabine's gull, Xema sabini
- Bonaparte's gull, Chroicocephalus philadelphia
- Black-headed gull, Chroicocephalus ridibundus (A)
- Little gull, Hydrocoloeus minutus (A)
- Gray gull, Leucophaeus modestus (A)
- Laughing gull, Leucophaeus atricilla
- Franklin's gull, Leucophaeus pipixcan
- Black-tailed gull, Larus crassirostris (A)
- Heermann's gull, Larus heermanni (near-threatened)
- Short-billed gull, Larus bracyyrhynchus
- Ring-billed gull, Larus delawarensis
- Western gull, Larus occidentalis
- Yellow-footed gull, Larus livens (breeding endemic)
- California gull, Larus californicus
- Herring gull, Larus argentatus
- Iceland gull, Larus glaucoides
- Lesser black-backed gull, Larus fuscus (A)
- Glaucous-winged gull, Larus glaucescens
- Glaucous gull, Larus hyperboreus
- Great black-backed gull, Larus marinus (A)
- Kelp gull, Larus dominicanus (A)
- Brown noddy, Anous stolidus
- Black noddy, Anous minutus (A)
- White tern, Gygis alba (A)
- Sooty tern, Onychoprion fuscata
- Bridled tern, Onychoprion anaethetus
- Least tern, Sternula antillarum
- Gull-billed tern, Gelochelidon nilotica
- Caspian tern, Hydroprogne caspia
- Black tern, Chlidonias niger
- Roseate tern, Sterna dougallii
- Common tern, Sterna hirundo
- Arctic tern, Sterna paradisaea
- Forster's tern, Sterna forsteri
- Royal tern, Thalasseus maxima
- Sandwich tern, Thalasseus sandvicensis
- Elegant tern, Thalasseus elegans (near-threatened)
- Black skimmer, Rynchops niger

== Sunbittern ==
Order: Eurypygiformes Family: Eurypygidae

The sunbittern is a bittern-like bird of tropical regions of the Americas and the sole member of the family Eurypygidae (sometimes spelled Eurypigidae) and genus Eurypyga.

- Sunbittern, Eurypyga helias (A)

== Tropicbirds ==
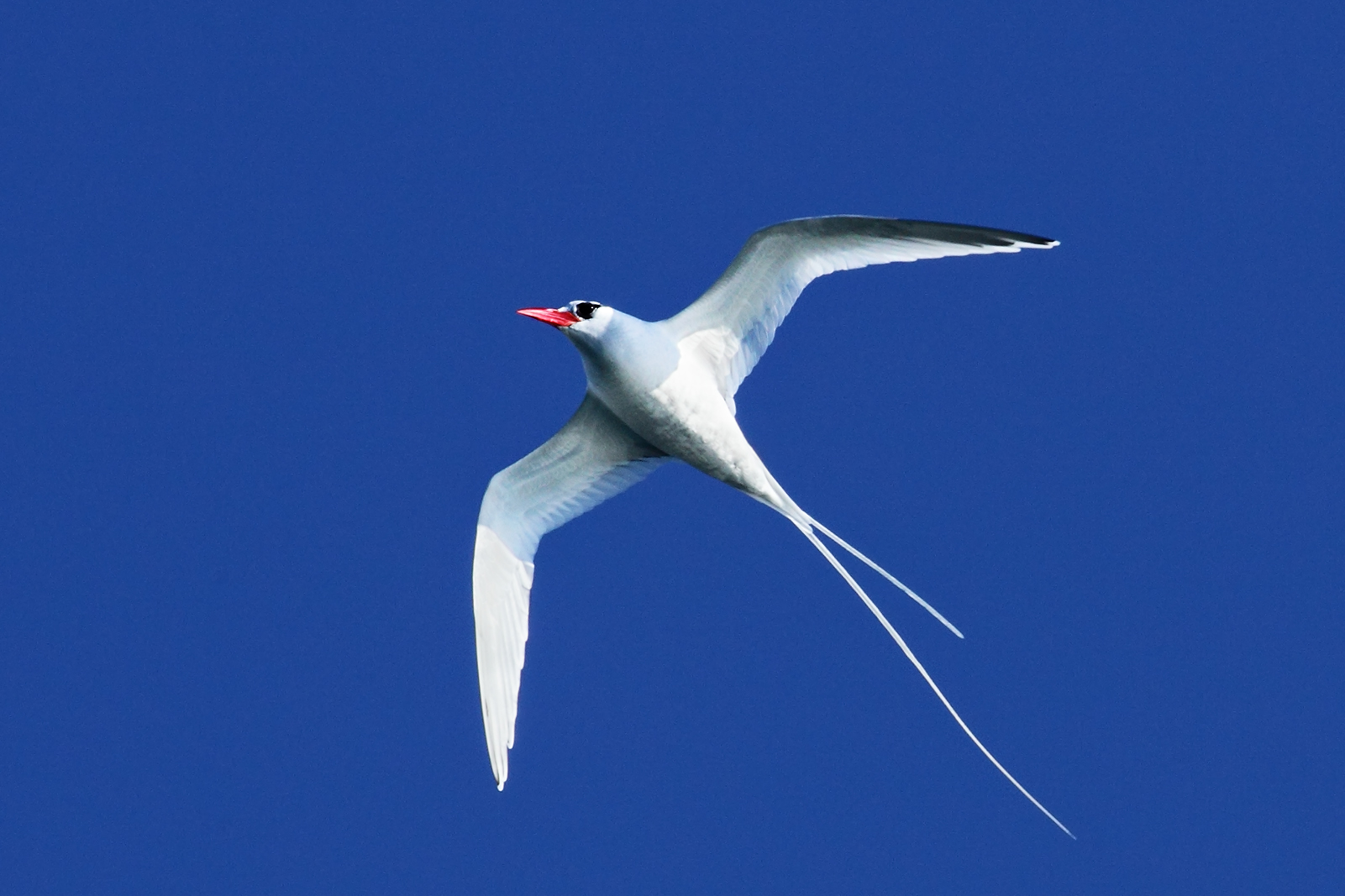
Red-billed tropicbird

Order: Phaethontiformes Family: Phaethontidae

Tropicbirds are slender white birds of tropical oceans which have exceptionally long central tail feathers. Their heads and long wings have black markings.

- White-tailed tropicbird, Phaethon lepturus (A)
- Red-billed tropicbird, Phaethon aethereus
- Red-tailed tropicbird, Phaethon rubricauda (A)

== Loons ==
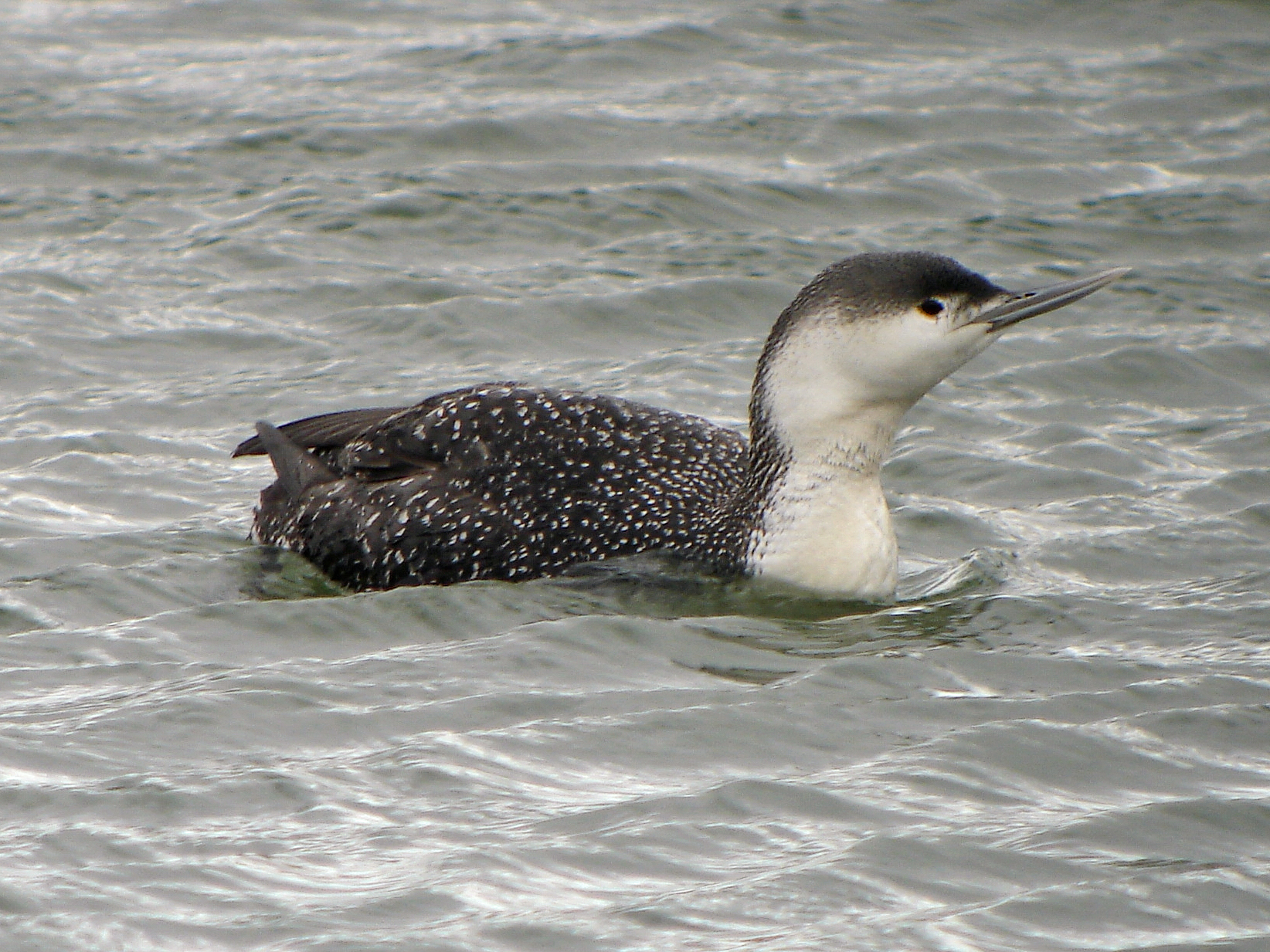
Red-throated loons winter in northwestern coastal areas.

Order: Gaviiformes Family: Gaviidae

Loons, known as divers in Europe, are a group of aquatic birds found in many parts of North America and northern Europe. They are the size of a large duck or small goose, which they somewhat resemble in shape when swimming.

- Red-throated loon, Gavia stellata
- Arctic loon, Gavia arctica (A)
- Pacific loon, Gavia pacifica
- Common loon, Gavia immer
- Yellow-billed loon, Gavia adamsii (A) (near-threatened)

== Albatrosses ==
Order: Procellariiformes Family: Diomedeidae

The albatrosses are among the largest of flying birds, and the great albatrosses from the genus Diomedea have the largest wingspans of any extant birds.

- Laysan albatross, Phoebastria immutabilis (near-threatened)
- Black-footed albatross, Phoebastria nigripes (near-threatened)
- Short-tailed albatross, Phoebastria albatrus (A) (vulnerable)

== Southern storm-petrels ==
Order: Procellariiformes Family: Oceanitidae

The storm-petrels are the smallest seabirds, relatives of the petrels, feeding on planktonic crustaceans and small fish picked from the surface, typically while hovering. The flight is fluttering and sometimes bat-like. Until 2018, this family's three species were included with the other storm-petrels in family Hydrobatidae.

- Wilson's storm-petrel, Oceanites oceanicus (A)
- White-bellied storm-petrel, Fregetta grallaria (A)
- Black-bellied storm-petrel, Fregetta tropica (A)

== Northern storm-petrels ==
Order: Procellariiformes Family: Hydrobatidae

Though the members of this family are similar in many respects to the southern storm-petrels, including their general appearance and habits, there are enough genetic differences to warrant their placement in a separate family.

- Fork-tailed storm-petrel, Hydrobates furcatus (A)
- Leach's storm-petrel, Hydrobates leucorhous (vulnerable)
- Townsend's storm-petrel, Hydrobates socorroensis (E) (endangered)
- Ainley's storm-petrel, Hydrobates cheimomnestes (vulnerable)
- Ashy storm-petrel, Hydrobates homochroa (endangered)
- Band-rumped storm-petrel, Hydrobates castro (A)
- Wedge-rumped storm-petrel, Hydrobatesa tethys
- Black storm-petrel, Hydrobates melania
- Guadalupe storm-petrel, Hydrobates macrodactylus (E) (critically endangered, possibly extinct)
- Least storm-petrel, Hydrobates microsoma

== Shearwaters and petrels ==
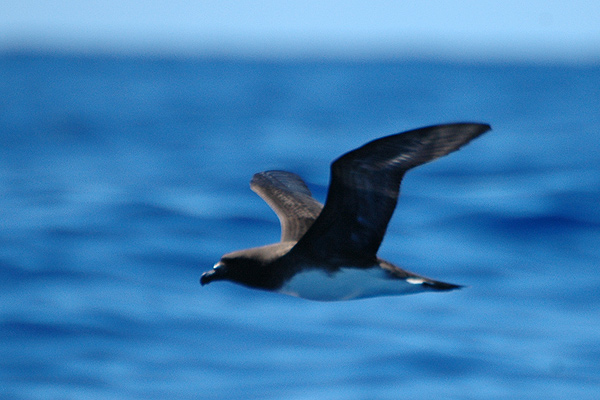
Tahiti petrel

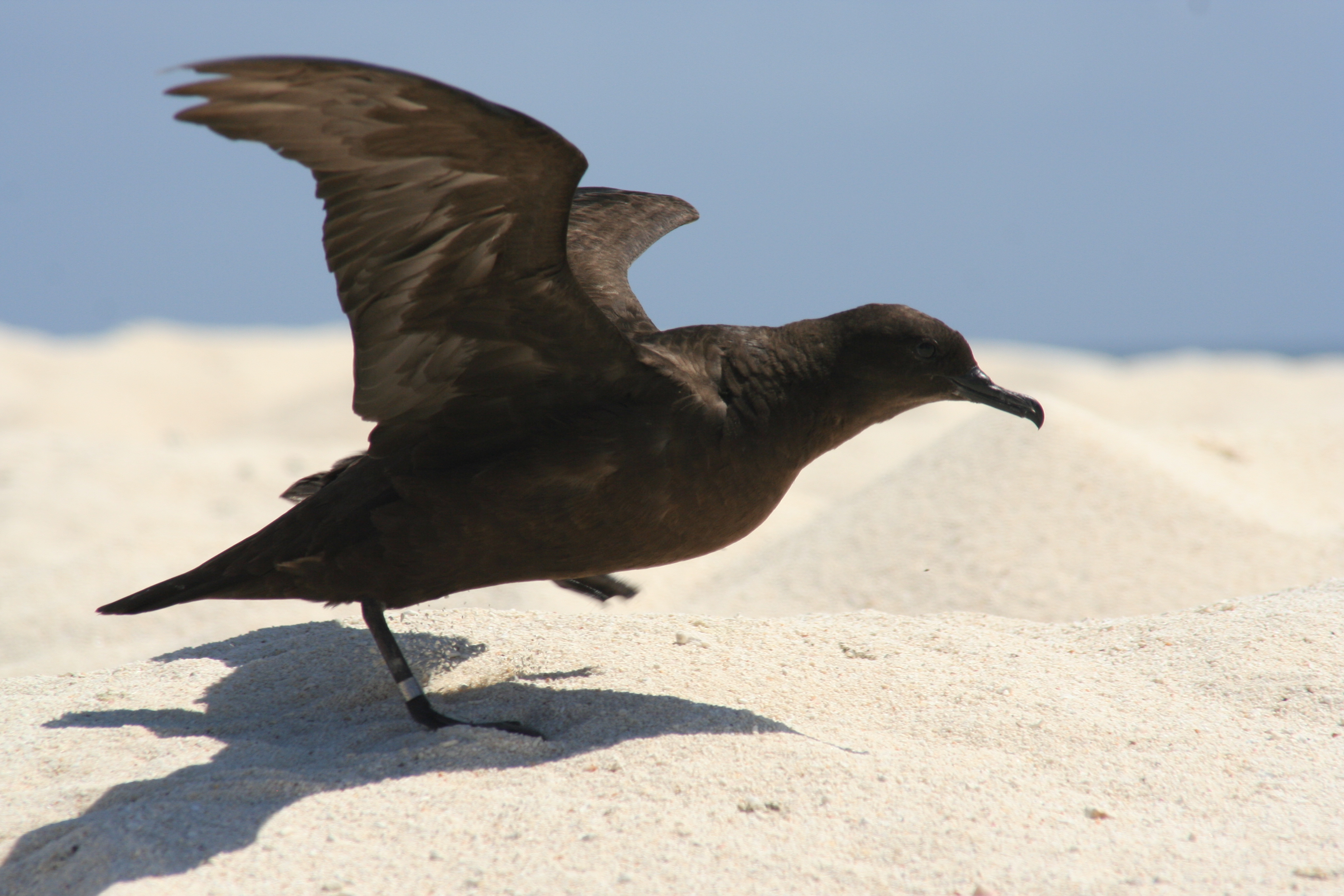
Christmas shearwater

Order: Procellariiformes Family: Procellariidae

The procellariids are the main group of medium-sized "true petrels", characterized by united nostrils with medium septum and a long outer functional primary.

- Northern fulmar, Fulmarus glacialis
- Kermadec petrel, Pterodroma neglecta (A)
- Herald petrel, Pterodroma heraldica (A)
- Murphy's petrel, Pterodroma ultima (A)
- Juan Fernandez petrel, Pterodroma externa (vulnerable)
- Galapagos petrel, Pterodroma phaeopygia (A) (critically endangered)
- White-necked petrel, Pterodroma cervicalis (A) (vulnerable)
- Cook's petrel, Pterodroma cookii (vulnerable)
- Tahiti petrel, Pterodroma rostrata (A) (near-threatened)
- Bulwer's petrel, Bulweria bulwerii (A)
- Parkinson's petrel, Procellaria parkinsoni (A) (vulnerable)
- Cory's shearwater, Calonectris diomedea (A)
- Wedge-tailed shearwater, Ardenna pacificus
- Buller's shearwater, Ardenna bulleri (A) (vulnerable)
- Short-tailed shearwater, Ardenna tenuirostris (A)
- Sooty shearwater, Ardenna griseus (near-threatened)
- Great shearwater, Ardenna gravis (A)
- Pink-footed shearwater, Ardenna creatopus (vulnerable)
- Flesh-footed shearwater, Ardenna carneipes (A) (near-threatened)
- Christmas shearwater, Puffinus nativitatis (A)
- Galapagos shearwater, Puffinus subalaris
- Manx shearwater, Puffinus puffinus (A)
- Townsend's shearwater, Puffinus auricularis (breeding endemic) (critically endangered)
- Black-vented shearwater, Puffinus opisthomelas (breeding endemic) (near-threatened)
- Sargasso shearwater, Puffinus lherminieri (A)

== Storks ==
Order: Ciconiiformes Family: Ciconiidae

Storks are large, long-legged, long-necked wading birds with long, stout bills. Storks are mute, but bill-clattering is an important mode of communication at the nest. Their nests can be large and may be reused for many years. Many species are migratory.

- Maguari stork, Ciconia maguari (A)
- Jabiru, Jabiru mycteria
- Wood stork, Mycteria americana

== Frigatebirds ==
Order: Suliformes Family: Fregatidae

Frigatebirds are large seabirds usually found over tropical oceans. They are large, black-and-white or completely black, with long wings and deeply forked tails. The males have colored inflatable throat pouches. They do not swim or walk and cannot take off from a flat surface. Having the largest wingspan-to-body-weight ratio of any bird, they are essentially aerial, able to stay aloft for more than a week.

- Lesser frigatebird, Fregata ariel (A)
- Magnificent frigatebird, Fregata magnificens
- Great frigatebird, Fregata minor

== Boobies and gannets ==
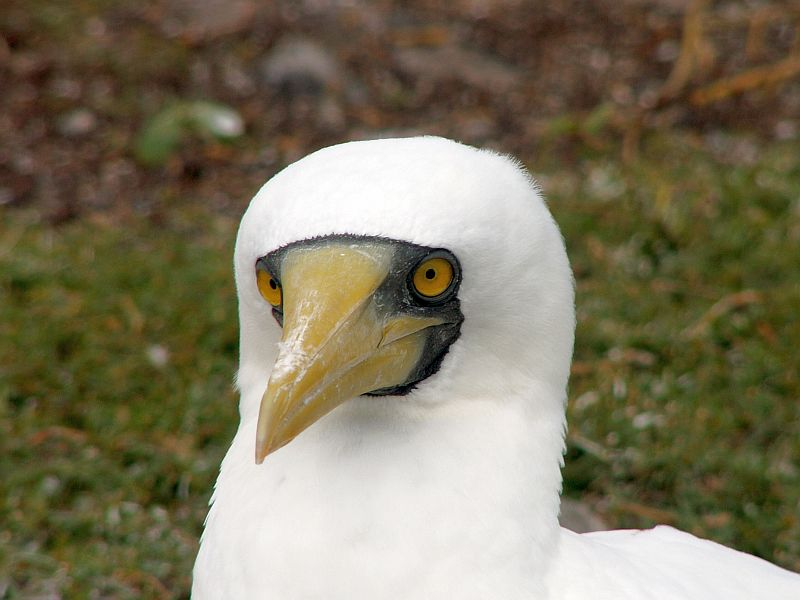
Masked booby

Order: Suliformes Family: Sulidae

The sulids comprise the gannets and boobies. Both groups are medium to large coastal seabirds that plunge-dive for fish.

- Masked booby, Sula dactylatra
- Nazca booby, Sula granti
- Blue-footed booby, Sula nebouxii
- Brown booby, Sula leucogaster
- Cocos booby, Sula brewsteri
- Red-footed booby, Sula sula
- Northern gannet, Morus bassanus

== Anhingas ==
Order: Suliformes Family: Anhingidae

Anhingas are often called "snake-birds" because of their long thin neck, which gives a snake-like appearance when they swim with their bodies submerged. The males have black and dark-brown plumage, an erectile crest on the nape, and a larger bill than the female. The females have much paler plumage especially on the neck and underparts. The anhingas have completely webbed feet and their legs are short and set far back on the body. Their plumage is somewhat permeable, like that of cormorants, and they spread their wings to dry after diving.

- Anhinga, Anhinga anhinga

== Cormorants and shags ==
Order: Suliformes Family: Phalacrocoracidae

Phalacrocoracidae is a family of medium to large coastal, fish-eating seabirds that includes cormorants and shags. Plumage coloration varies, with the majority having mainly dark plumage, some species being black-and-white, and a few being colorful.

- Brandt's cormorant, Urile penicillatus
- Pelagic cormorant, Urile pelagicus
- Double-crested cormorant, Nannopterum auritum
- Neotropic cormorant, Nannopterum brasilianum

== Pelicans ==
Order: Pelecaniformes Family: Pelecanidae

Pelicans are large water birds with a distinctive pouch under their beak. As with other members of the order Pelecaniformes, they have webbed feet with four toes.

- American white pelican, Pelecanus erythrorhynchos
- Brown pelican, Pelecanus occidentalis

== Herons, egrets, and bitterns ==
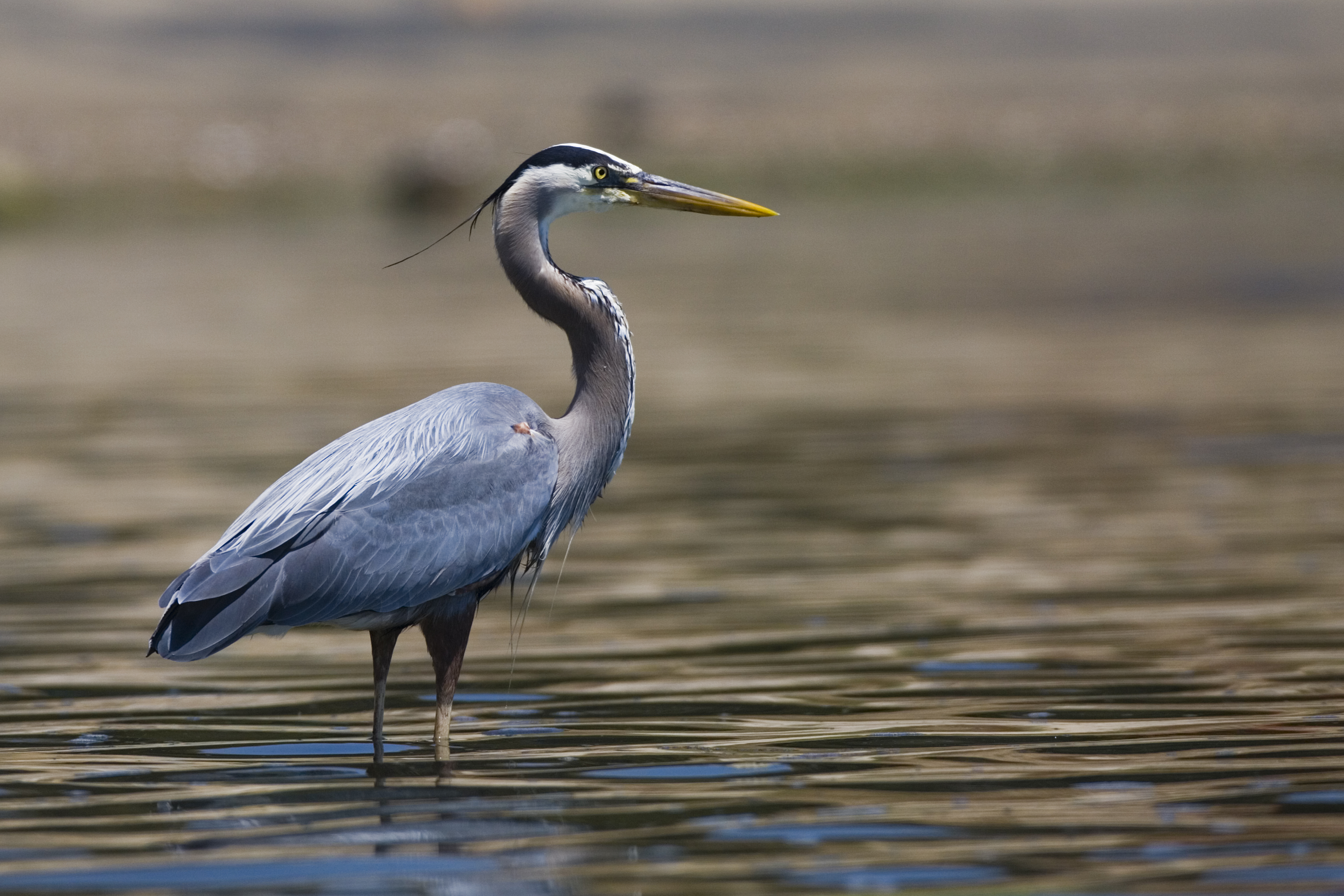
Great blue heron

Order: Pelecaniformes Family: Ardeidae

The family Ardeidae contains the bitterns, herons, and egrets. Herons and egrets are medium to large wading birds with long necks and legs. Bitterns tend to be shorter necked and more wary. Members of Ardeidae fly with their necks retracted, unlike other long-necked birds such as storks, ibises and spoonbills.

- Pinnated bittern, Botaurus pinnatus
- American bittern, Botaurus lentiginosus
- Least bittern, Ixobrychus exilis
- Bare-throated tiger-heron, Tigrisoma mexicanum
- Great blue heron, Ardea herodias
- Great egret, Ardea alba
- Snowy egret, Egretta thula
- Little blue heron, Egretta caerulea
- Tricolored heron, Egretta tricolor
- Reddish egret, Egretta rufescens (near-threatened)
- Cattle egret, Bubulcus ibis
- Green heron, Butorides virescens
- Agami heron, Agamia agami (vulnerable)
- Black-crowned night-heron, Nycticorax nycticorax
- Yellow-crowned night-heron, Nyctanassa violacea
- Boat-billed heron, Cochlearius cochlearius

== Ibises and spoonbills ==
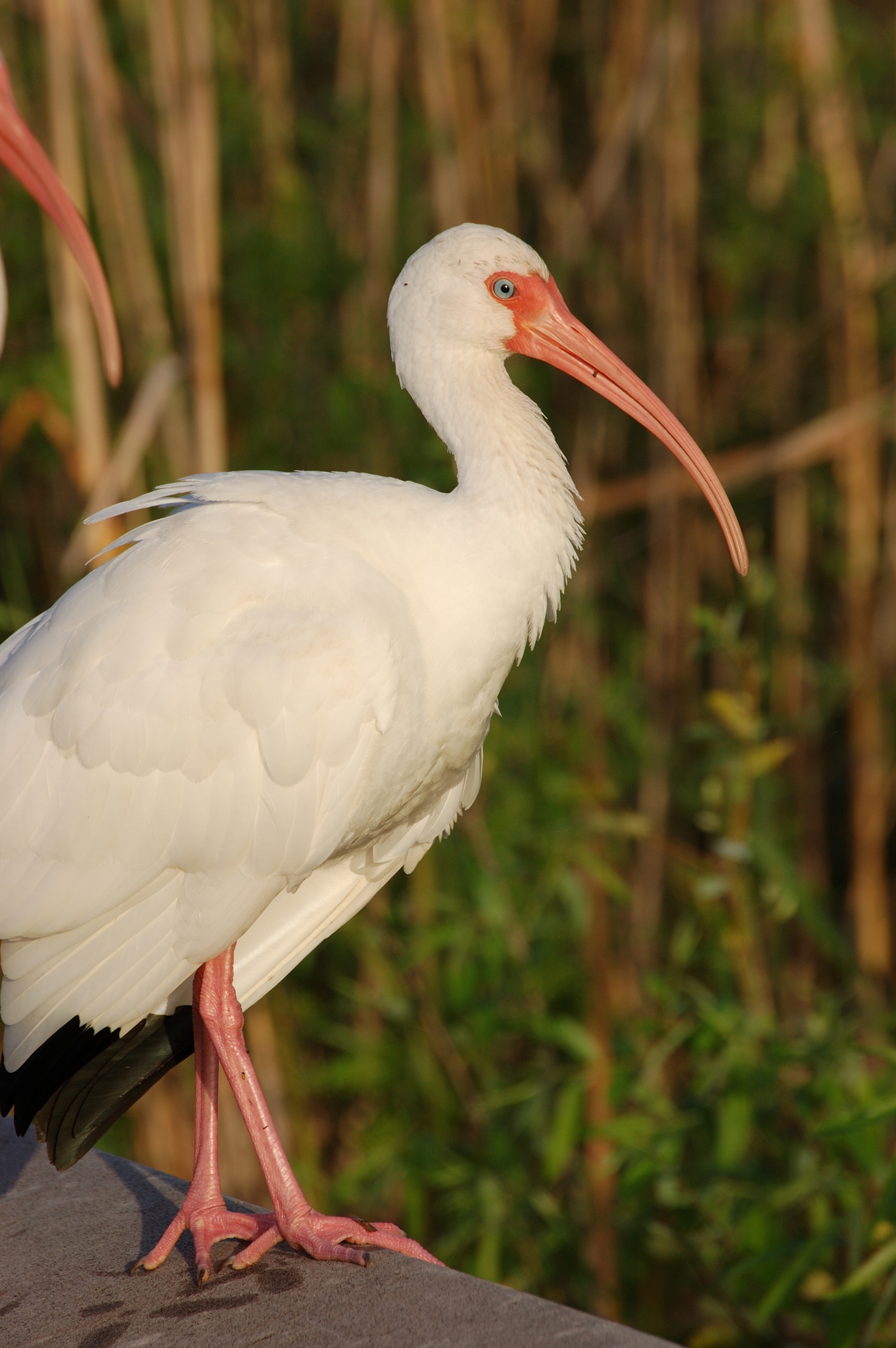
White ibis

Order: Pelecaniformes Family: Threskiornithidae

Threskiornithidae is a family of large terrestrial and wading birds which includes the ibises and spoonbills. They have long, broad wings with 11 primary and about 20 secondary feathers. They are strong fliers and despite their size and weight, very capable soarers.

- White ibis, Eudocimus albus
- Glossy ibis, Plegadis falcinellus
- White-faced ibis, Plegadis chihi
- Roseate spoonbill, Platalea ajaja

== New World vultures ==
Order: Cathartiformes Family: Cathartidae

The New World vultures are not closely related to Old World vultures, but superficially resemble them because of convergent evolution. Like the Old World vultures, they are scavengers. However, unlike Old World vultures, which find carcasses by sight, New World vultures have a good sense of smell with which they locate carrion.

- California condor, Gymnogyps californianus (critically endangered) reintroduced
- King vulture, Sarcoramphus papa
- Black vulture, Coragyps atratus
- Turkey vulture, Cathartes aura
- Lesser yellow-headed vulture, Cathartes burrovianus

== Osprey ==
Order: Accipitriformes Family: Pandionidae

The family Pandionidae contains only one species, the osprey. The osprey is a medium-large raptor which is a specialist fish-eater with a worldwide distribution.

- Osprey, Pandion haliaetus

== Hawks, eagles, and kites ==
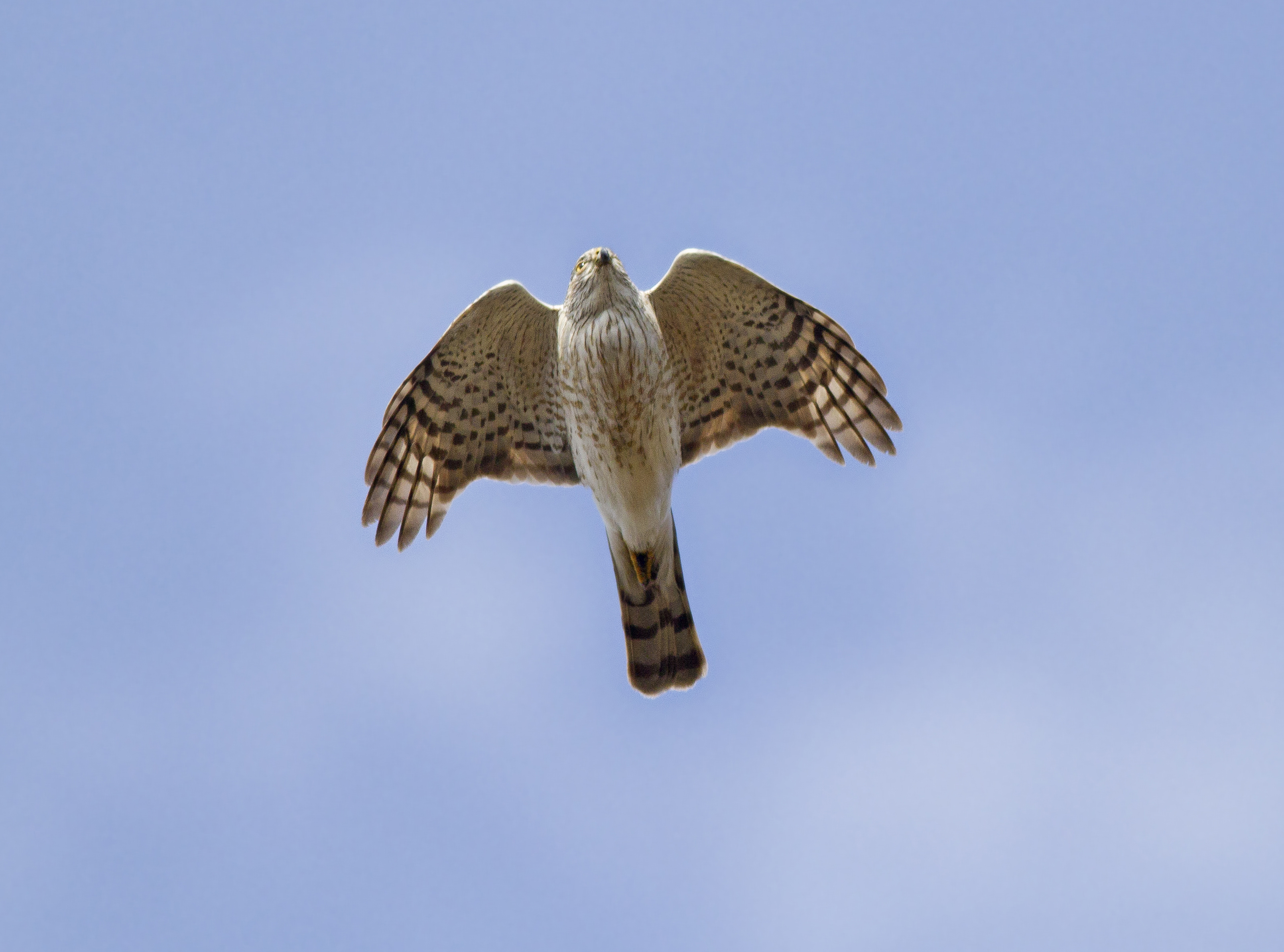
Sharp-shinned hawk

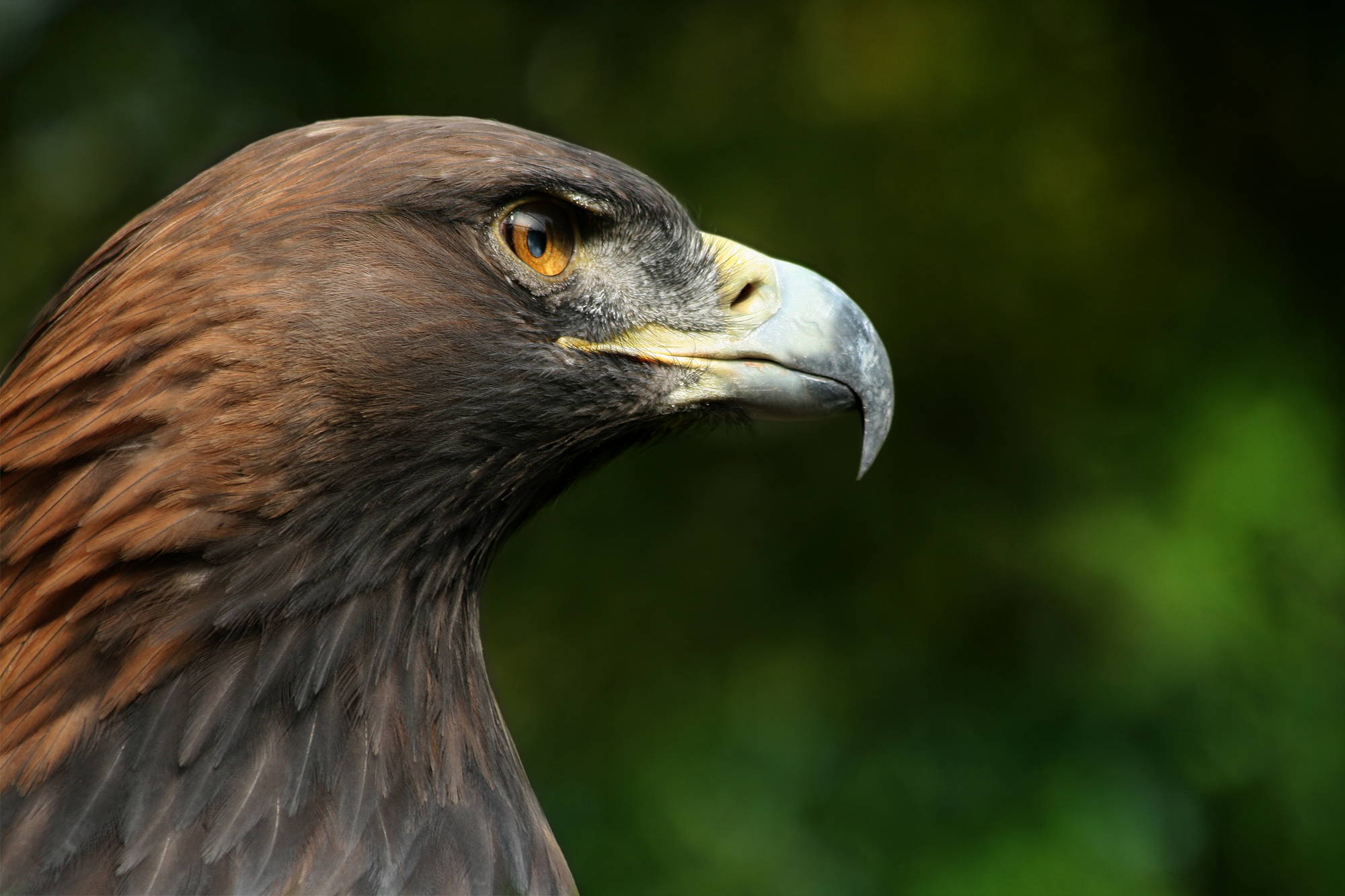
Golden eagle

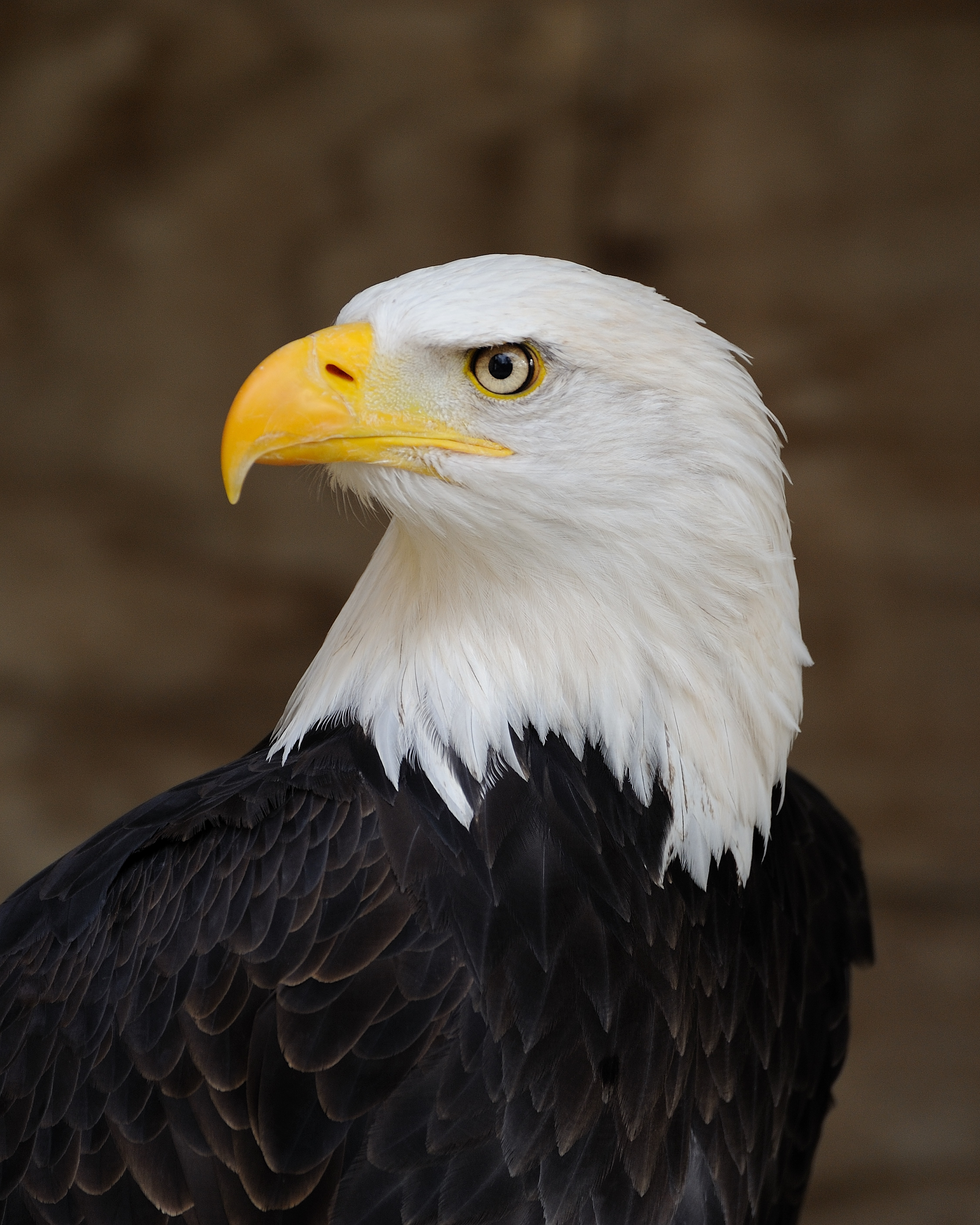
Bald eagle

Order: Accipitriformes Family: Accipitridae

Accipitridae is a family of birds of prey, which includes hawks, eagles, kites, harriers, and Old World vultures. These birds have powerful hooked beaks for tearing flesh from their prey, strong legs, powerful talons, and keen eyesight.

- White-tailed kite, Elanus leucurus
- Hook-billed kite, Chondrohierax uncinatus
- Gray-headed kite, Leptodon cayanensis
- Swallow-tailed kite, Elanoides forficatus
- Crested eagle, Morphnus guianensis (near-threatened)
- Harpy eagle, Harpia harpyja (near-threatened)
- Golden eagle, Aquila chrysaetos
- Black hawk-eagle, Spizaetus tyrannus
- Black-and-white hawk-eagle, Spizaetus melanoleucus
- Ornate hawk-eagle, Spizaetus ornatus (near-threatened)
- Double-toothed kite, Harpagus bidentatus
- Northern harrier, Circus hudsonius
- Sharp-shinned hawk, Accipiter striatus
- Cooper's hawk, Accipiter cooperii
- Bicolored hawk, Accipiter bicolor
- American goshawk, Accipiter atricapillus
- Bald eagle, Haliaeetus leucocephalus
- Mississippi kite, Ictinia mississippiensis
- Plumbeous kite, Ictinia plumbea
- Black-collared hawk, Busarellus nigricollis
- Crane hawk, Geranospiza caerulescens
- Snail kite, Rostrhamus sociabilis
- Common black hawk, Buteogallus anthracinus
- Great black hawk, Buteogallus urubitinga
- Solitary eagle, Buteogallus solitarius (near-threatened)
- Roadside hawk, Rupornis magnirostris
- Harris's hawk, Parabuteo unicinctus
- White-tailed hawk, Geranoaetus albicaudatus
- White hawk, Pseudastur albicollis
- Gray hawk, Buteo plagiatus
- Red-shouldered hawk, Buteo lineatus
- Broad-winged hawk, Buteo platypterus
- Short-tailed hawk, Buteo brachyurus
- Swainson's hawk, Buteo swainsoni
- Zone-tailed hawk, Buteo albonotatus
- Red-tailed hawk, Buteo jamaicensis
- Rough-legged hawk, Buteo lagopus
- Ferruginous hawk, Buteo regalis

== Barn-owls ==
Order: Strigiformes Family: Tytonidae

Barn-owls are medium to large owls with large heads and characteristic heart-shaped faces. They have long strong legs with powerful talons.

- American barn owl, Tyto furcata

== Owls ==
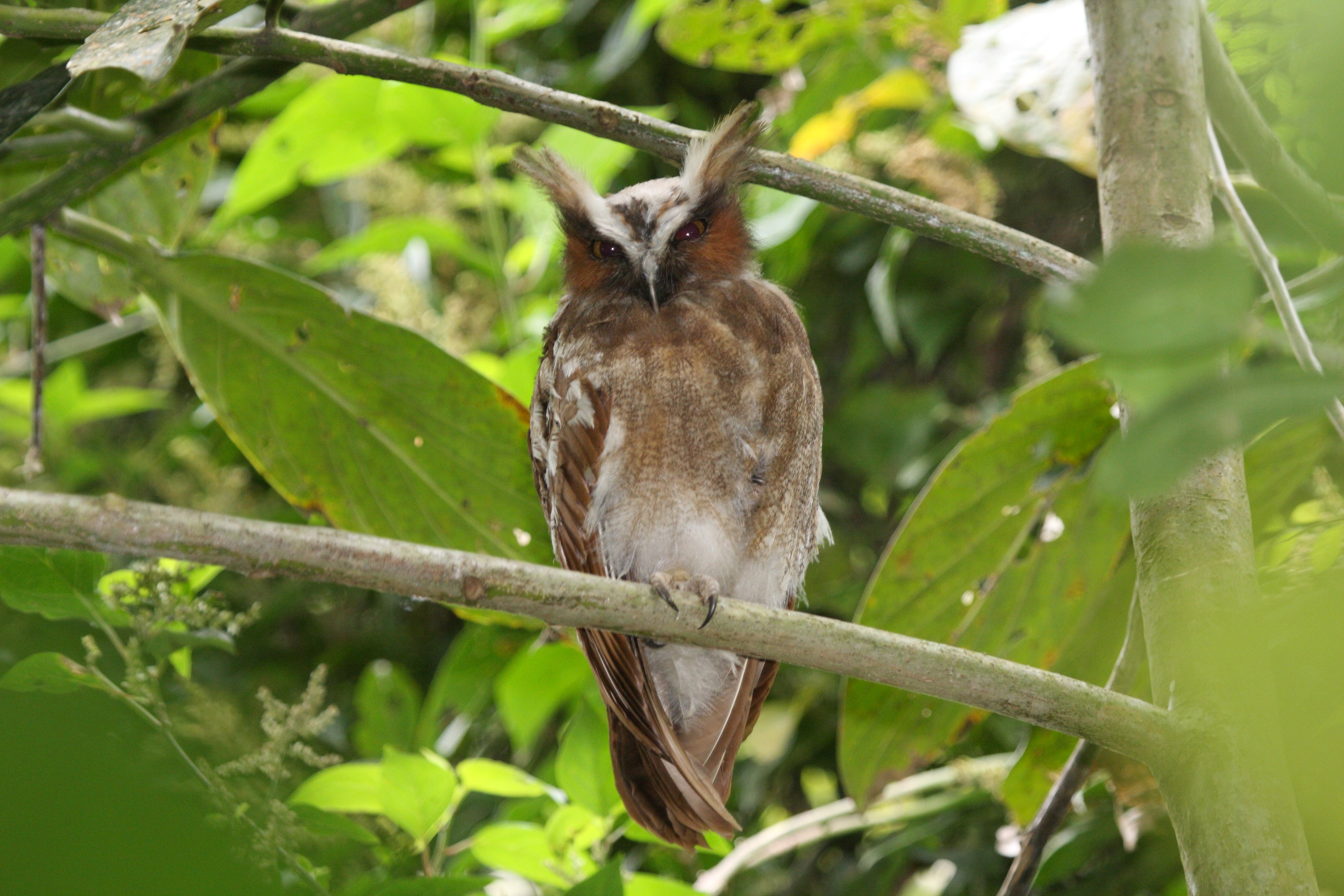
Crested owl

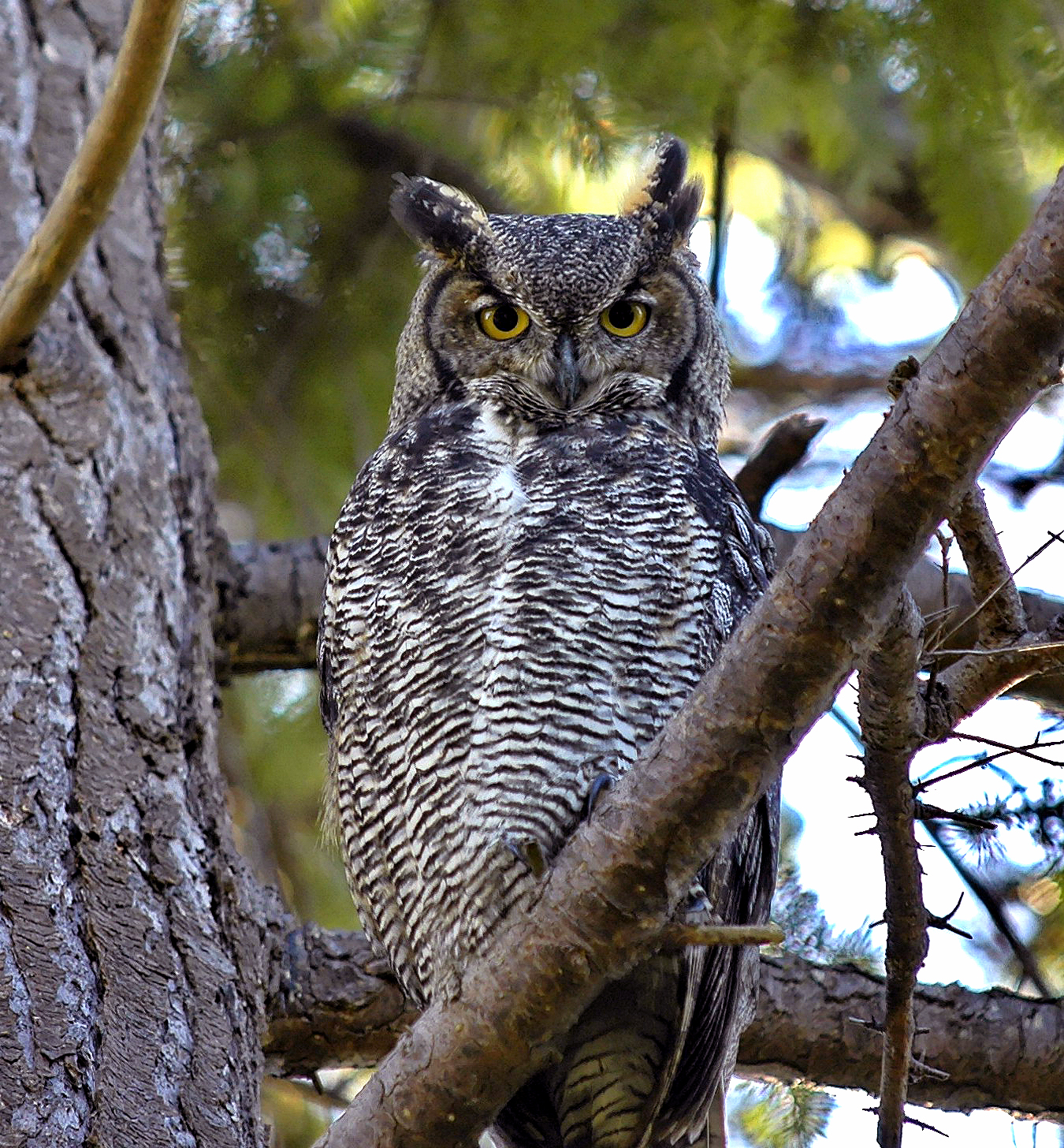
Great horned owl

Order: Strigiformes Family: Strigidae

The typical owls are small to large solitary nocturnal birds of prey. They have large forward-facing eyes and ears, a hawk-like beak, and a conspicuous circle of feathers around each eye called a facial disk.

- Flammulated owl, Psiloscops flammeolus
- Whiskered screech-owl, Megascops trichopsis
- Bearded screech-owl, Megascops barbarus (vulnerable)
- Pacific screech-owl, Megascops cooperi
- Western screech-owl, Megascops kennicottii
- Eastern screech-owl, Megascops asio
- Balsas screech-owl, Megascops seductus (E)
- Middle American screech owl, Megascops guatemalae
- Crested owl, Lophostrix cristata
- Spectacled owl, Pulsatrix perspicillata
- Great horned owl, Bubo virginianus
- Northern pygmy-owl, Glaucidium gnoma
- Central American pygmy-owl, Glaucidium griseiceps
- Tamaulipas pygmy-owl, Glaucidium sanchezi (E) (near-threatened)
- Colima pygmy-owl, Glaucidium palmarum (E)
- Ferruginous pygmy-owl, Glaucidium brasilianum
- Elf owl, Micrathene whitneyi
- Burrowing owl, Athene cunicularia
- Mottled owl, Strix virgata
- Black-and-white owl, Strix nigrolineata
- Spotted owl, Strix occidentalis (near-threatened)
- Cinereous owl, Strix sartorii
- Fulvous owl, Strix fulvescens
- Long-eared owl, Asio otus
- Stygian owl, Asio stygius
- Short-eared owl, Asio flammeus
- Striped owl, Asio clamator
- Northern saw-whet owl, Aegolius acadicus
- Unspotted saw-whet owl, Aegolius ridgwayi

== Trogons ==
Order: Trogoniformes Family: Trogonidae

The family Trogonidae includes trogons and quetzals. Found in tropical woodlands worldwide, they feed on insects and fruit, and their broad bills and weak legs reflect their diet and arboreal habits. Although their flight is fast, they are reluctant to fly any distance. Trogons have soft, often colorful, feathers with distinctive male and female plumage.

- Slaty-tailed trogon, Trogon massena
- Black-headed trogon, Trogon melanocephalus
- Citreoline trogon, Trogon citreolus (E)
- Gartered trogon, Trogon caligatus
- Elegant trogon, Trogon elegans
- Mountain trogon, Trogon mexicanus
- Collared trogon, Trogon collaris
- Eared quetzal, Euptilotis neoxenus (E) (near-threatened)
- Resplendent quetzal, Pharomachrus mocinno (near-threatened)

== Motmots ==
Order: Coraciiformes Family: Momotidae

The motmots have colorful plumage and long, graduated tails which they display by waggling back and forth. In most of the species, the barbs near the ends of the two longest (central) tail feathers are weak and fall off, leaving a length of bare shaft and creating a racket-shaped tail.

- Tody motmot, Hylomanes momotula
- Blue-throated motmot, Aspatha gularis
- Russet-crowned motmot, Momotus mexicanus
- Blue-capped motmot, Momotus coeruliceps (E)
- Lesson's motmot, Momotus lessonii
- Keel-billed motmot, Electron carinatum (A) (vulnerable)
- Turquoise-browed motmot, Eumomota superciliosa

== Kingfishers ==
Order: Coraciiformes Family: Alcedinidae

Kingfishers are medium-sized birds with large heads, long, pointed bills, short legs, and stubby tails.

- Belted kingfisher, Megaceryle alcyon
- Ringed kingfisher, Megaceryle torquatus
- Amazon kingfisher, Chloroceryle amazona
- American pygmy kingfisher, Chloroceryle aenea
- Green kingfisher, Chloroceryle americana

== Puffbirds ==
Order: Piciformes Family: Bucconidae

The puffbirds are related to the jacamars and have the same range, but lack the iridescent colors of that family. They are mainly brown, rufous, or gray, with large heads and flattened bills with hooked tips. The loose abundant plumage and short tails makes them look stout and puffy, giving rise to the English common name of the family.

- White-necked puffbird, Notharchus hyperrhynchus
- White-whiskered puffbird, Malacoptila panamensis

== Jacamars ==
Order: Piciformes Family: Galbulidae

The jacamars are near passerine birds from tropical South America, with a range that extends up to Mexico. They feed on insects caught on the wing, and are glossy, elegant birds with long bills and tails. In appearance and behavior they resemble the Old World bee-eaters, although they are more closely related to puffbirds.

- Rufous-tailed jacamar, Galbula ruficauda

== Toucans ==
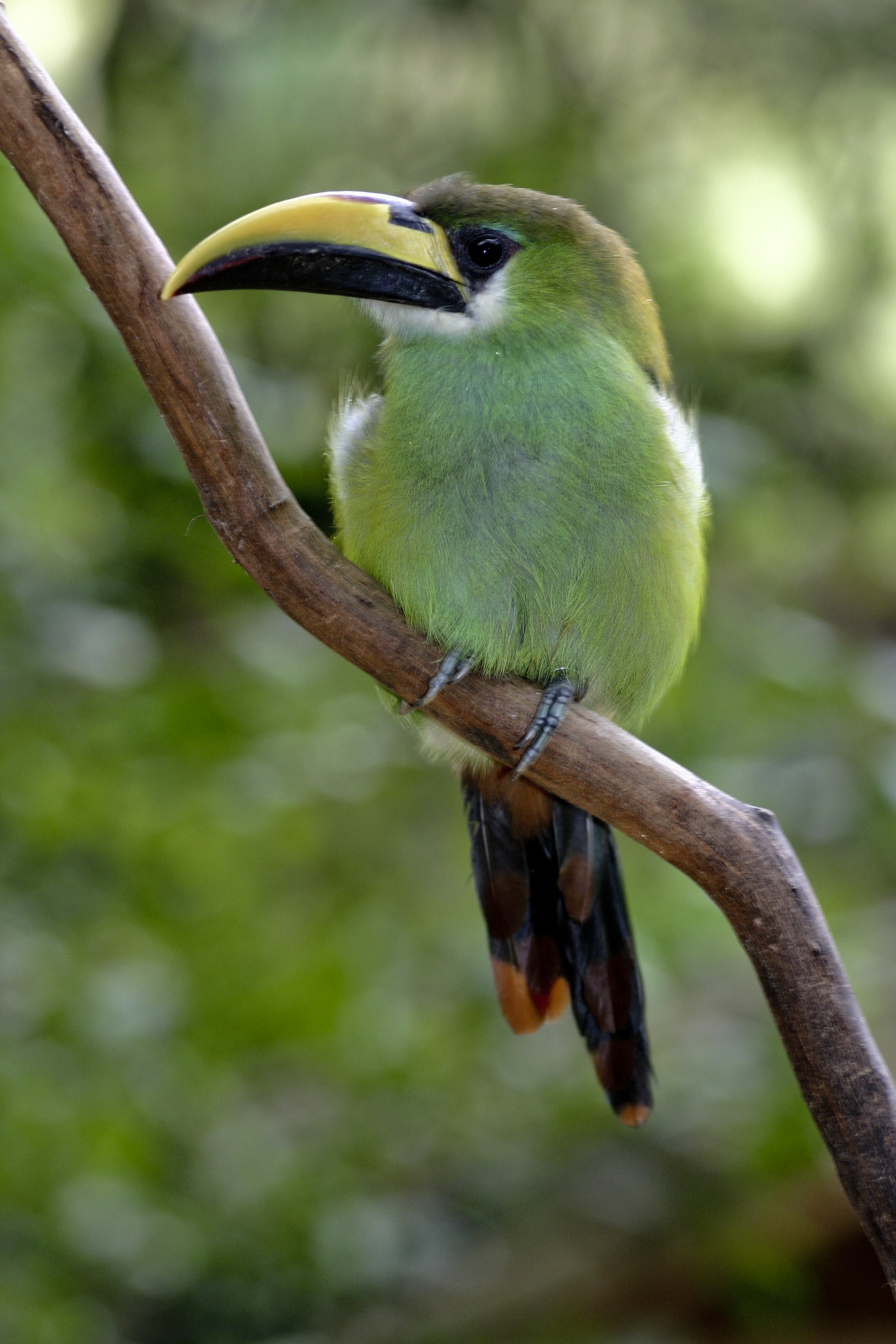
Northern emerald-toucanet

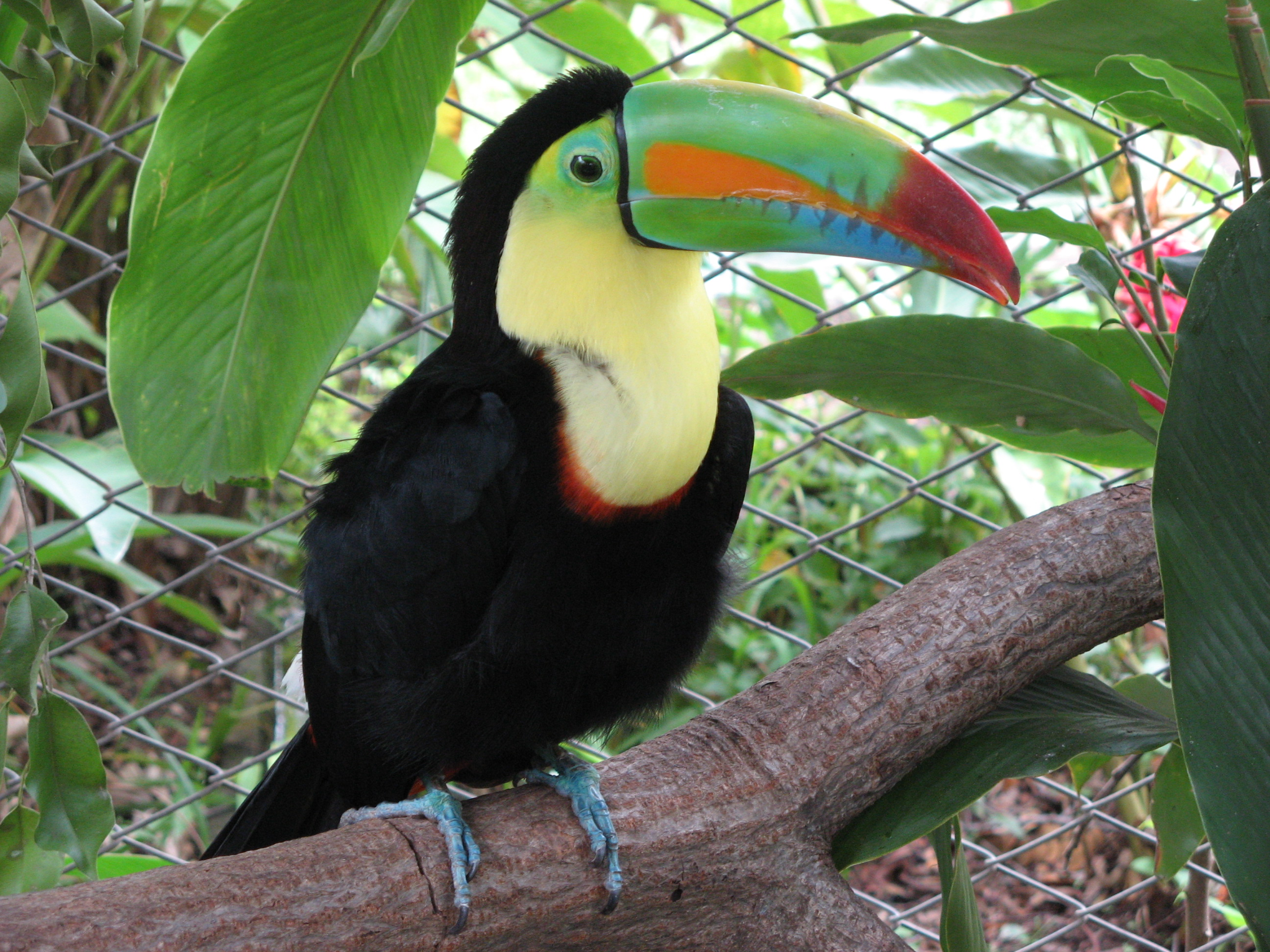
Keel-billed toucan

Order: Piciformes Family: Ramphastidae

Toucans are near passerine birds from the Neotropics. They are brightly marked and have enormous, colorful bills which in some species amount to half their body length.

- Northern emerald-toucanet, Aulacorhynchus prasinus
- Collared aracari, Pteroglossus torquatus
- Keel-billed toucan, Ramphastos sulfuratus

== Woodpeckers ==
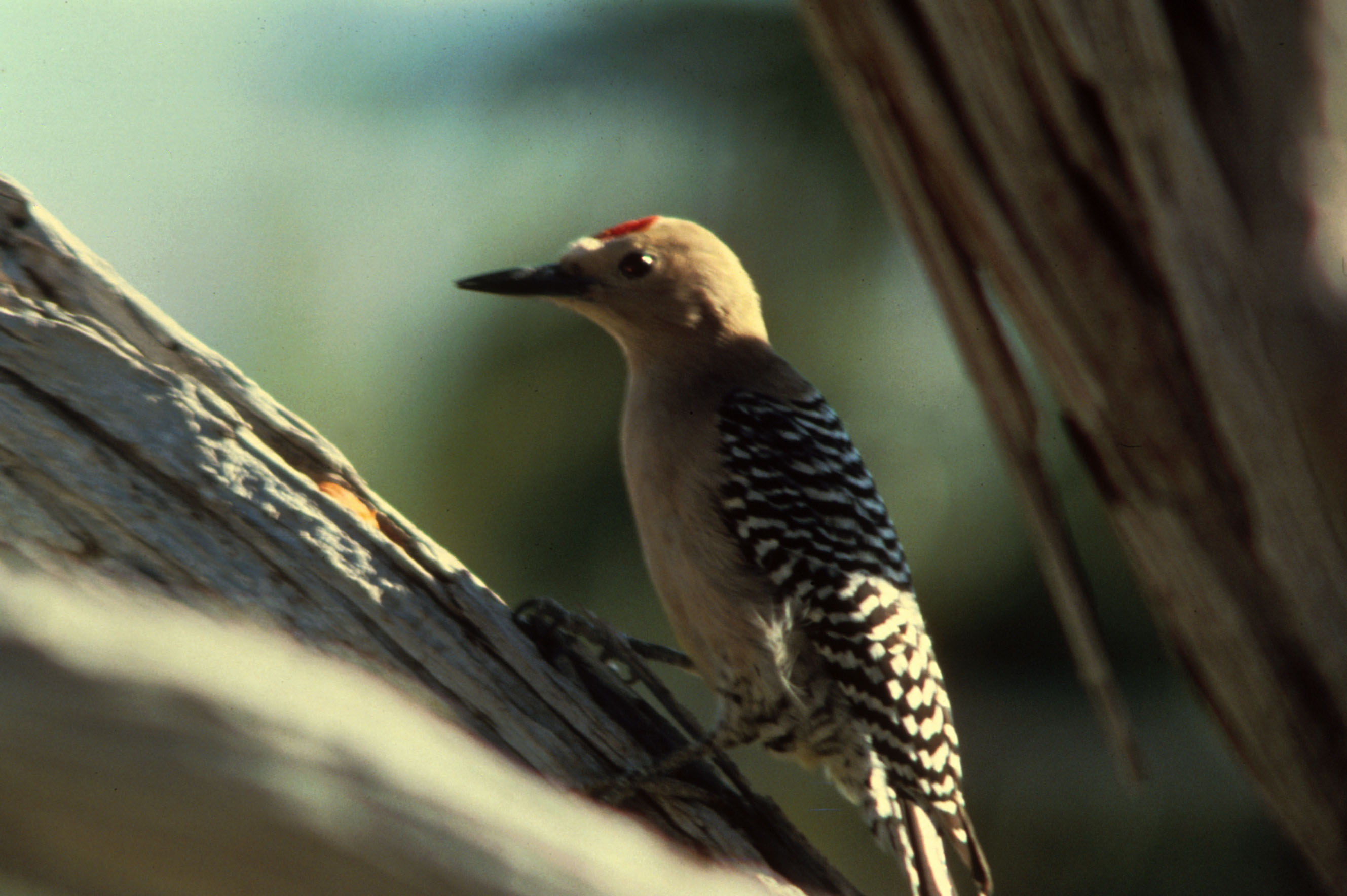
Gila woodpecker

Order: Piciformes Family: Picidae

Woodpeckers are small to medium-sized birds with chisel-like beaks, short legs, stiff tails, and long tongues used for capturing insects. Some species have feet with two toes pointing forward and two backward, while several species have only three toes. Many woodpeckers have the habit of tapping noisily on tree trunks with their beaks.

- Lewis's woodpecker, Melanerpes lewis
- Acorn woodpecker, Melanerpes formicivorus
- Black-cheeked woodpecker, Melanerpes pucherani
- Golden-cheeked woodpecker, Melanerpes chrysogenys (E)
- Gray-breasted woodpecker, Melanerpes hypopolius (E)
- Yucatan woodpecker, Melanerpes pygmaeus
- Gila woodpecker, Melanerpes uropygialis
- Golden-fronted woodpecker, Melanerpes aurifrons
- Williamson's sapsucker, Sphyrapicus thyroideus
- Yellow-bellied sapsucker, Sphyrapicus varius
- Red-naped sapsucker, Sphyrapicus nuchalis
- Red-breasted sapsucker, Sphyrapicus ruber
- Downy woodpecker, Dryobates pubescens
- Nuttall's woodpecker, Dryobates nuttallii
- Ladder-backed woodpecker, Dryobates scalaris
- Hairy woodpecker, Dryobates villosus
- Smoky-brown woodpecker, Dryobates fumigatus
- Arizona woodpecker, Dryobates arizonae
- Strickland's woodpecker, Dryobates stricklandi (E)
- Golden-olive woodpecker, Colaptes rubiginosus
- Gray-crowned woodpecker, Colaptes auricularis (E)
- Northern flicker, Colaptes auratus
- Gilded flicker, Colaptes chrysoides
- Guatemalan flicker, Colaptes mexicanoides
- Chestnut-colored woodpecker, Celeus castaneus
- Lineated woodpecker, Dryocopus lineatus
- Pale-billed woodpecker, Campephilus guatemalensis
- Imperial woodpecker, Campephilus imperialis (E) (critically endangered, possibly extinct)

== Falcons and caracaras ==
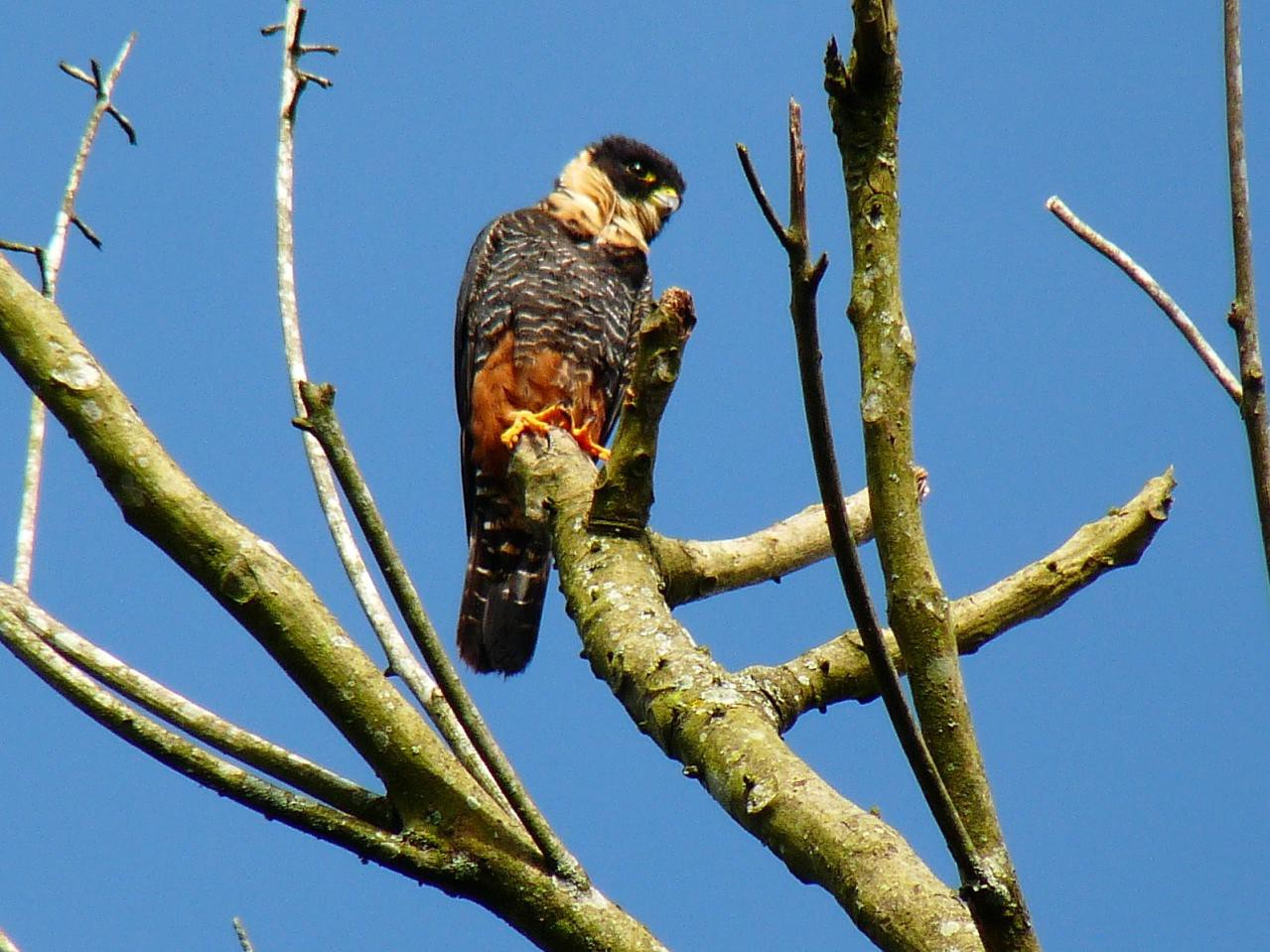
Bat falcon

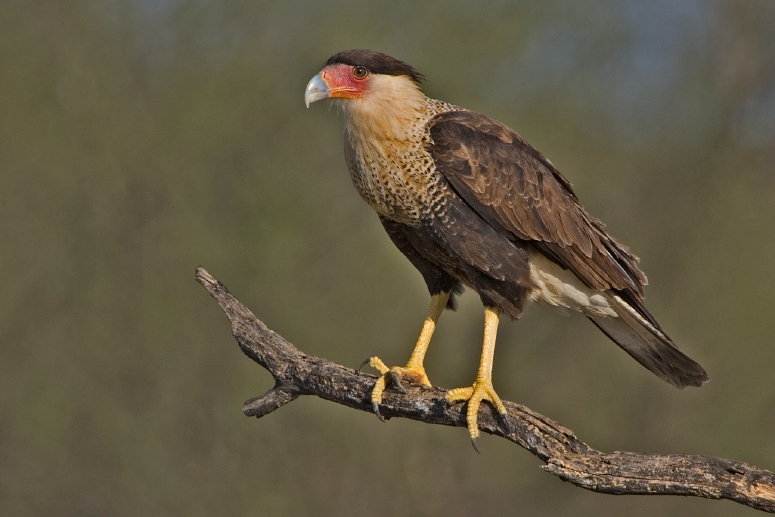
Crested caracara

Order: Falconiformes Family: Falconidae

Falconidae is a family of diurnal birds of prey. They differ from hawks, eagles, and kites in that they kill with their beaks instead of their talons.

- Laughing falcon, Herpetotheres cachinnans
- Barred forest-falcon, Micrastur ruficollis
- Collared forest-falcon, Micrastur semitorquatus
- Red-throated caracara, Ibycter americanus (A)
- Crested caracara, Caracara plancus
- Guadalupe caracara, Caracara lutosa (E) (extinct)
- Yellow-headed caracara, Milvago chimachima (A)
- American kestrel, Falco sparverius
- Merlin, Falco columbarius
- Aplomado falcon, Falco femoralis
- Bat falcon, Falco rufigularis
- Orange-breasted falcon, Falco deiroleucus (near-threatened)
- Peregrine falcon, Falco peregrinus
- Prairie falcon, Falco mexicanus

== New World and African parrots ==
Order: Psittaciformes Family: Psittacidae

Parrots are small to large birds with a characteristic curved beak. Their upper mandibles have slight mobility in the joint with the skull and they have a generally erect stance. All parrots are zygodactyl, having the four toes on each foot placed two at the front and two to the back.

- Monk parakeet, Myiopsitta monachus (I)
- Olive-throated parakeet, Eupsittula nana
- Orange-fronted parakeet, Eupsittula canicularis
- Scarlet macaw, Ara macao
- Military macaw, Ara militaris (vulnerable)
- Green parakeet, Psittacara holochlorus
- Socorro parakeet, Psittacara brevipes (E)
- Pacific parakeet, Psittacara strenuus
- Thick-billed parrot, Rhynchopsitta pachyrhyncha (E) (endangered)
- Maroon-fronted parrot, Rhynchopsitta terrisi (E) (endangered)
- Barred parakeet, Bolborhynchus lineola
- Mexican parrotlet, Forpus cyanopygius (E) (near-threatened)
- Orange-chinned parakeet, Brotogeris jugularis
- Brown-hooded parrot, Pionopsitta haematotis
- White-crowned parrot, Pionus senilis
- White-fronted parrot, Amazona albifrons
- Yellow-lored parrot, Amazona xantholora
- Red-crowned parrot, Amazona viridigenalis (E) (endangered)
- Lilac-crowned parrot, Amazona finschi (E) (endangered)
- Red-lored parrot, Amazona autumnalis
- Mealy parrot, Amazona farinosa
- Yellow-headed parrot, Amazona oratrix (endangered)
- Yellow-naped parrot, Amazona auropalliata (vulnerable)

== Manakins ==
Order: Passeriformes Family: Pipridae

The manakins are a family of subtropical and tropical mainland Central and South America, and Trinidad and Tobago. They are compact forest birds, the males typically being brightly colored, although the females of most species are duller and usually green-plumaged. Manakins feed on small fruits, berries and insects.

- Long-tailed manakin, Chiroxiphia linearis
- White-collared manakin, Manacus candei
- Red-capped manakin, Ceratopipra mentalis

== Cotingas ==
Order: Passeriformes Family: Cotingidae

The cotingas are birds of forests or forest edges in tropical South America. Comparatively little is known about this diverse group, although all have broad bills with hooked tips, rounded wings, and strong legs. The males of many of the species are brightly colored or decorated with plumes or wattles.

- Lovely cotinga, Cotinga amabilis
- Rufous piha, Lipaugus unirufus

== Tityras and allies ==
Order: Passeriformes Family: Tityridae

Tityridae is family of suboscine passerine birds found in forest and woodland in the Neotropics. The approximately 30 species in this family were formerly lumped with the families Pipridae and Cotingidae (see Taxonomy).

- Northern schiffornis, Schiffornis veraepacis
- Speckled mourner, Laniocera rufescens
- Masked tityra, Tityra semifasciata
- Black-crowned tityra, Tityra inquisitor
- Cinnamon becard, Pachyramphus cinnamomeus
- White-winged becard, Pachyramphus polychopterus (A)
- Gray-collared becard, Pachyramphus major
- Rose-throated becard, Pachyramphus aglaiae

== Royal flycatcher and allies ==
Order: Passeriformes Family: Onychorhynchidae

The members of this small family, created in 2018, were formerly considered to be tyrant flycatchers, family Tyrannidae.

- Royal flycatcher, Onychorhynchus mexicanus
- Ruddy-tailed flycatcher, Terenotriccus erythrurus
- Sulphur-rumped flycatcher, Myiobius sulphureipygius

== Tyrant flycatchers ==
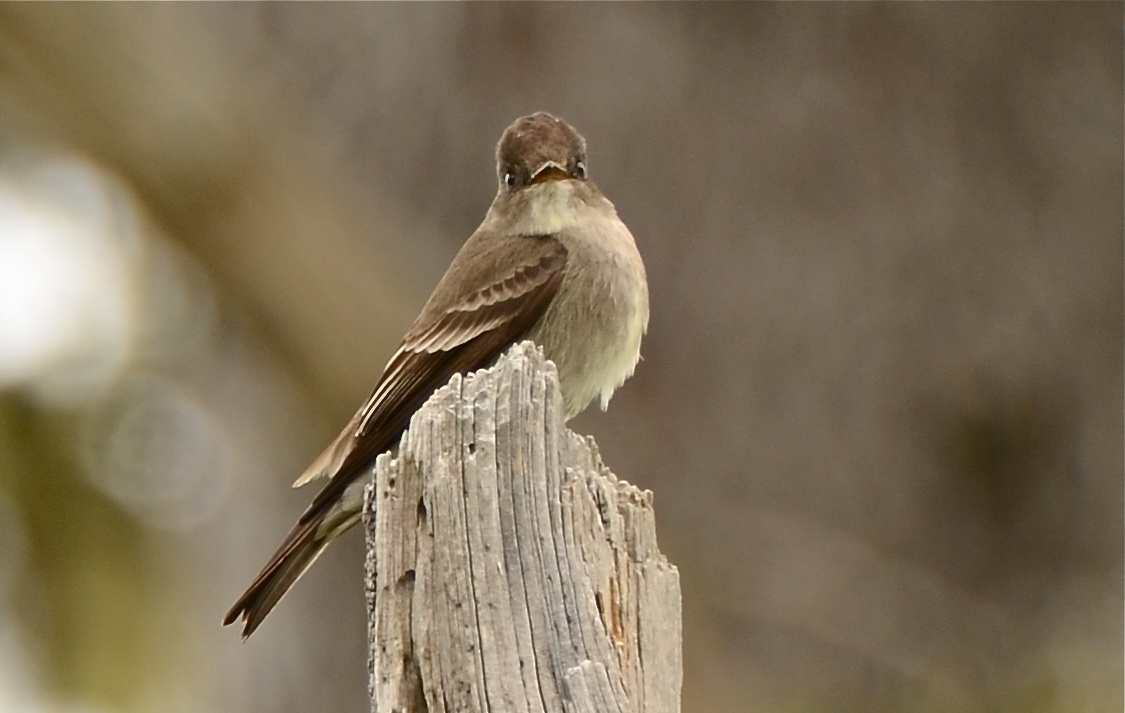
Western wood-pewee

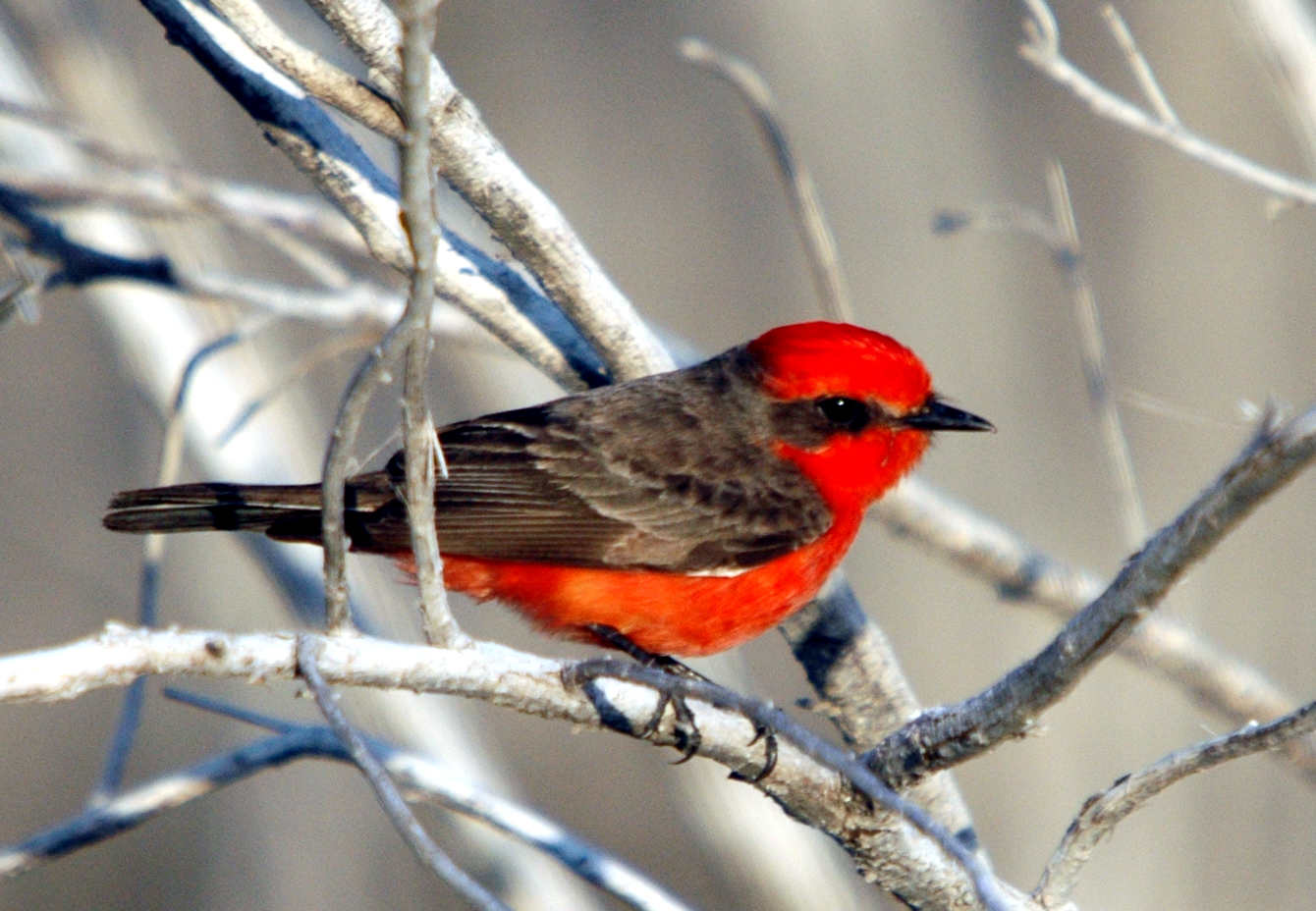
Vermilion flycatcher

Order: Passeriformes Family: Tyrannidae

Tyrant flycatchers are passerine birds which occur throughout North and South America. They superficially resemble the Old World flycatchers, but are more robust and have stronger bills. They do not have the sophisticated vocal capabilities of the songbirds. Most, but not all, have plain coloring. As the name implies, most are insectivorous.

- Stub-tailed spadebill, Platyrinchus cancrominus
- Ochre-bellied flycatcher, Mionectes oleagineus
- Sepia-capped flycatcher, Leptopogon amaurocephalus
- Northern bentbill, Oncostoma cinereigulare
- Slate-headed tody-flycatcher, Poecilotriccus sylvia
- Common tody-flycatcher, Todirostrum cinereum
- Eye-ringed flatbill, Rhynchocyclus brevirostris
- Yellow-olive flycatcher, Tolmomyias sulphurescens
- Yellow-bellied tyrannulet, Ornithion semiflavum
- Northern beardless-tyrannulet, Camptostoma imberbe
- Greenish elaenia, Myiopagis viridicata
- Caribbean elaenia, Elaenia martinica
- Yellow-bellied elaenia, Elaenia flavogaster
- Mountain elaenia, Elaenia frantzii
- Guatemalan tyrannulet, Zimmerius vilissimus
- Bright-rumped attila, Attila spadiceus
- Rufous mourner, Rhytipterna holerythra
- Yucatan flycatcher, Myiarchus yucatanensis
- Dusky-capped flycatcher, Myiarchus tuberculifer
- Ash-throated flycatcher, Myiarchus cinerascens
- Nutting's flycatcher, Myiarchus nuttingi
- Great crested flycatcher, Myiarchus crinitus
- Brown-crested flycatcher, Myiarchus tyrannulus
- Flammulated flycatcher, Ramphotrigon flammulatus (E)
- Great kiskadee, Pitangus sulphuratus
- Boat-billed flycatcher, Megarynchus pitangua
- Social flycatcher, Myiozetetes similis
- Streaked flycatcher, Myiodynastes maculatus
- Sulphur-bellied flycatcher, Myiodynastes luteiventris
- Piratic flycatcher, Legatus leucophaius
- Tropical kingbird, Tyrannus melancholicus
- Couch's kingbird, Tyrannus couchii
- Cassin's kingbird, Tyrannus vociferans
- Thick-billed kingbird, Tyrannus crassirostris
- Western kingbird, Tyrannus verticalis
- Eastern kingbird, Tyrannus tyrannus
- Gray kingbird, Tyrannus dominicensis (A)
- Scissor-tailed flycatcher, Tyrannus forficatus
- Fork-tailed flycatcher, Tyrannus savana
- Belted flycatcher, Xenotriccus callizonus (E)
- Pileated flycatcher, Xenotriccus mexicanus (E)
- Tufted flycatcher, Mitrephanes phaeocercus
- Olive-sided flycatcher, Contopus cooperi (near-threatened)
- Greater pewee, Contopus pertinax
- Western wood-pewee, Contopus sordidulus
- Eastern wood-pewee, Contopus virens
- Tropical pewee, Contopus cinereus
- Yellow-bellied flycatcher, Empidonax flaviventris
- Acadian flycatcher, Empidonax virescens
- Alder flycatcher, Empidonax alnorum
- Willow flycatcher, Empidonax traillii
- White-throated flycatcher, Empidonax albigularis
- Least flycatcher, Empidonax minimus
- Hammond's flycatcher, Empidonax hammondii
- Gray flycatcher, Empidonax wrightii
- Dusky flycatcher, Empidonax oberholseri
- Pine flycatcher, Empidonax affinis
- Western flycatcher, Empidonax difficilis'
- Yellowish flycatcher, Empidonax flavescens
- Buff-breasted flycatcher, Empidonax fulvifrons
- Black phoebe, Sayornis nigricans
- Eastern phoebe, Sayornis phoebe
- Say's phoebe, Sayornis saya
- Vermilion flycatcher, Pyrocephalus rubinus

== Typical antbirds ==
Order: Passeriformes Family: Thamnophilidae

The antbirds are a large family of small passerine birds of subtropical and tropical Central and South America. They are forest birds which tend to feed on insects at or near the ground. A sizable minority of them specialize in following columns of army ants to eat small invertebrates that leave their hiding places to flee from the ants. Many species lack bright color, with brown, black, and white being the dominant tones.

- Great antshrike, Taraba major
- Barred antshrike, Thamnophilus doliatus
- Russet antshrike, Thamnistes anabatinus
- Plain antvireo, Dysithamnus mentalis
- Slaty antwren, Myrmotherula schisticolor (A)
- Dot-winged antwren, Microrhopias quixensis
- Dusky antbird, Cercomacroides tyrannina
- Bare-crowned antbird, Gymnocichla nudiceps (A)

== Antpittas ==
Order: Passeriformes Family: Grallariidae

Antpittas resemble the true pittas with strong, longish legs, very short tails, and stout bills.

- Scaled antpitta, Grallaria guatimalensis

== Antthrushes ==
Order: Passeriformes Family: Formicariidae

Antthrushes resemble small rails with strong, longish legs, very short tails, and stout bills.

- Mayan antthrush, Formicarius moniliger
- Black-faced antthrush, Formicarius analis

== Ovenbirds and woodcreepers ==
Order: Passeriformes Family: Furnariidae

Ovenbirds comprise a large family of small sub-oscine passerine bird species found in Central and South America. They are a diverse group of insectivores which gets its name from the elaborate "oven-like" clay nests built by some species, although others build stick nests or nest in tunnels or clefts in rock. The woodcreepers are brownish birds which maintain an upright vertical posture, supported by their stiff tail vanes. They feed mainly on insects taken from tree trunks.

- Middle American leaftosser, Sclerurus mexicanus
- Scaly-throated leaftosser, Sclerurus guatemalensis
- Olivaceous woodcreeper, Sittasomus griseicapillus
- Ruddy woodcreeper, Dendrocincla homochroa
- Tawny-winged woodcreeper, Dendrocincla anabatina
- Wedge-billed woodcreeper, Glyphorynchus spirurus
- Northern barred-woodcreeper, Dendrocolaptes sanctithomae
- Black-banded woodcreeper, Dendrocolaptes picumnus (A)
- Strong-billed woodcreeper, Xiphocolaptes promeropirhynchus
- Ivory-billed woodcreeper, Xiphorhynchus flavigaster
- Spotted woodcreeper, Xiphorhynchus erythropygius
- Streak-headed woodcreeper, Lepidocolaptes souleyetii
- White-striped woodcreeper, Lepidocolaptes leucogaster (E)
- Spot-crowned woodcreeper, Lepidocolaptes affinis
- Plain xenops, Xenops minutus
- Scaly-throated foliage-gleaner, Anabacerthia variegaticeps
- Ruddy foliage-gleaner, Clibanornis rubiginosus
- Buff-throated foliage-gleaner, Automolus ochrolaemus
- Rufous-breasted spinetail, Synallaxis erythrothorax

== Vireos, shrike-babblers, and erpornis ==
Order: Passeriformes Family: Vireonidae

The vireos are a group of small to medium-sized passerine birds mostly restricted to the New World, though a few other species in the family are found in Asia. They are typically greenish in color and resemble wood-warblers apart from their heavier bills.

- Rufous-browed peppershrike, Cyclarhis gujanensis
- Chestnut-sided shrike-vireo, Vireolanius melitophrys
- Green shrike-vireo, Vireolanius pulchellus
- Tawny-crowned greenlet, Tunchiornis ochraceiceps
- Lesser greenlet, Pachysylvia decurtata
- Golden vireo, Vireo hypochryseus (E)
- Slaty vireo, Vireo brevipennis (E)
- Black-capped vireo, Vireo atricapilla (near-threatened)
- Dwarf vireo, Vireo nelsoni (E)
- White-eyed vireo, Vireo griseus
- Mangrove vireo, Vireo pallens
- Cozumel vireo, Vireo bairdi (E)
- Bell's vireo, Vireo bellii (near-threatened)
- Gray vireo, Vireo vicinior
- Hutton's vireo, Vireo huttoni
- Yellow-throated vireo, Vireo flavifrons
- Cassin's vireo, Vireo cassinii
- Blue-headed vireo, Vireo solitarius
- Plumbeous vireo, Vireo plumbeus
- Philadelphia vireo, Vireo philadelphicus
- Warbling vireo, Vireo gilvus
- Brown-capped vireo, Vireo leucophrys
- Red-eyed vireo, Vireo olivaceus
- Yellow-green vireo, Vireo flavoviridis
- Black-whiskered vireo, Vireo altiloquus (A)
- Yucatan vireo, Vireo magister

== Shrikes ==
Order: Passeriformes Family: Laniidae

Shrikes are passerine birds known for their habit of catching other birds and small animals and impaling the uneaten portions of their bodies on thorns. A shrike's beak is hooked, like that of a typical bird of prey.

- Loggerhead shrike, Lanius ludovicianus

== Crows, jays, and magpies ==
Order: Passeriformes Family: Corvidae

The family Corvidae includes crows, ravens, jays, choughs, magpies, treepies, nutcrackers, and ground jays. Corvids are above average in size among the Passeriformes, and some of the larger species show high levels of intelligence.

- White-throated jay, Cyanolyca mirabilis (E) (vulnerable)
- Dwarf jay, Cyanolyca nanus (E) (near-threatened)
- Black-throated jay, Cyanolyca pumilo
- Azure-hooded jay, Cyanolyca cucullata
- Black-throated magpie-jay, Calocitta colliei (E)
- White-throated magpie-jay, Calocitta formosa
- Brown jay, Psilorhinus morio
- Tufted jay, Cyanocorax dickeyi (E) (near-threatened)
- Green jay, Cyanocorax yncas
- San Blas jay, Cyanocorax sanblasianus (E)
- Yucatan jay, Cyanocorax yucatanicus
- Purplish-backed jay, Cyanocorax beecheii (E)
- Pinyon jay, Gymnorhinus cyanocephalus (vulnerable)
- Steller's jay, Cyanocitta stelleri
- California scrub-jay, Aphelocoma californica
- Woodhouse's scrub-jay, Aphelocoma woodhouseii
- Transvolcanic jay, Aphelocoma ultramarina (E)
- Mexican jay, Aphelocoma wollweberi
- Unicolored jay, Aphelocoma unicolor
- Clark's nutcracker, Nucifraga columbiana
- American crow, Corvus brachyrhynchos
- Tamaulipas crow, Corvus imparatus (E)
- Sinaloa crow, Corvus sinaloae (E)
- Chihuahuan raven, Corvus cryptoleucus
- Common raven, Corvus corax
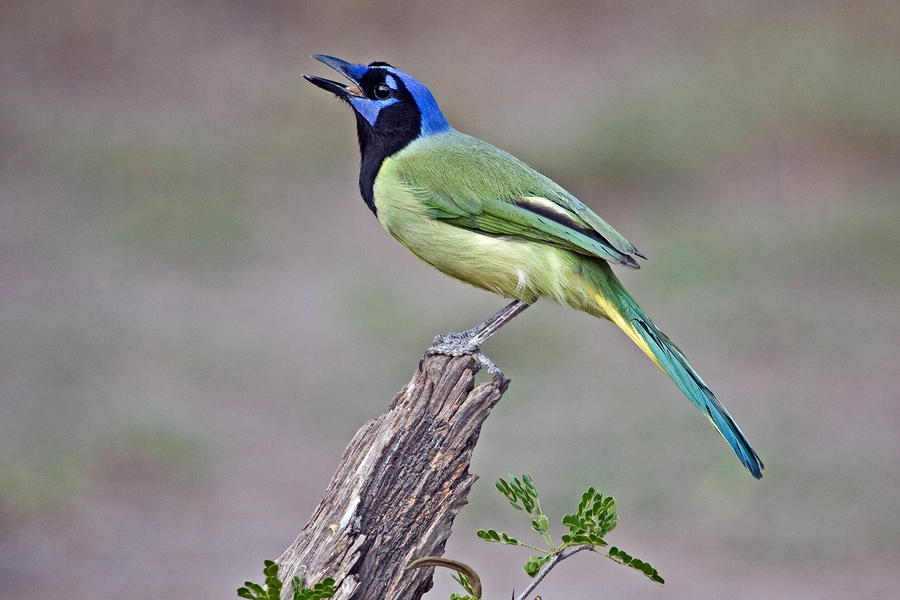
Green jay

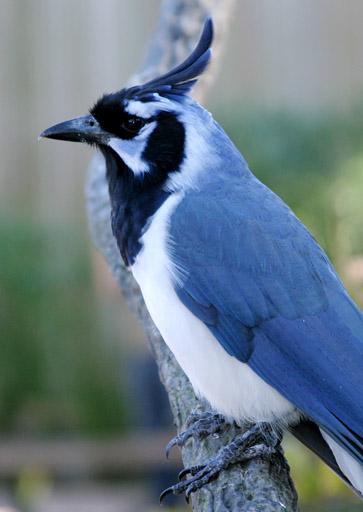
Black-throated magpie-jay

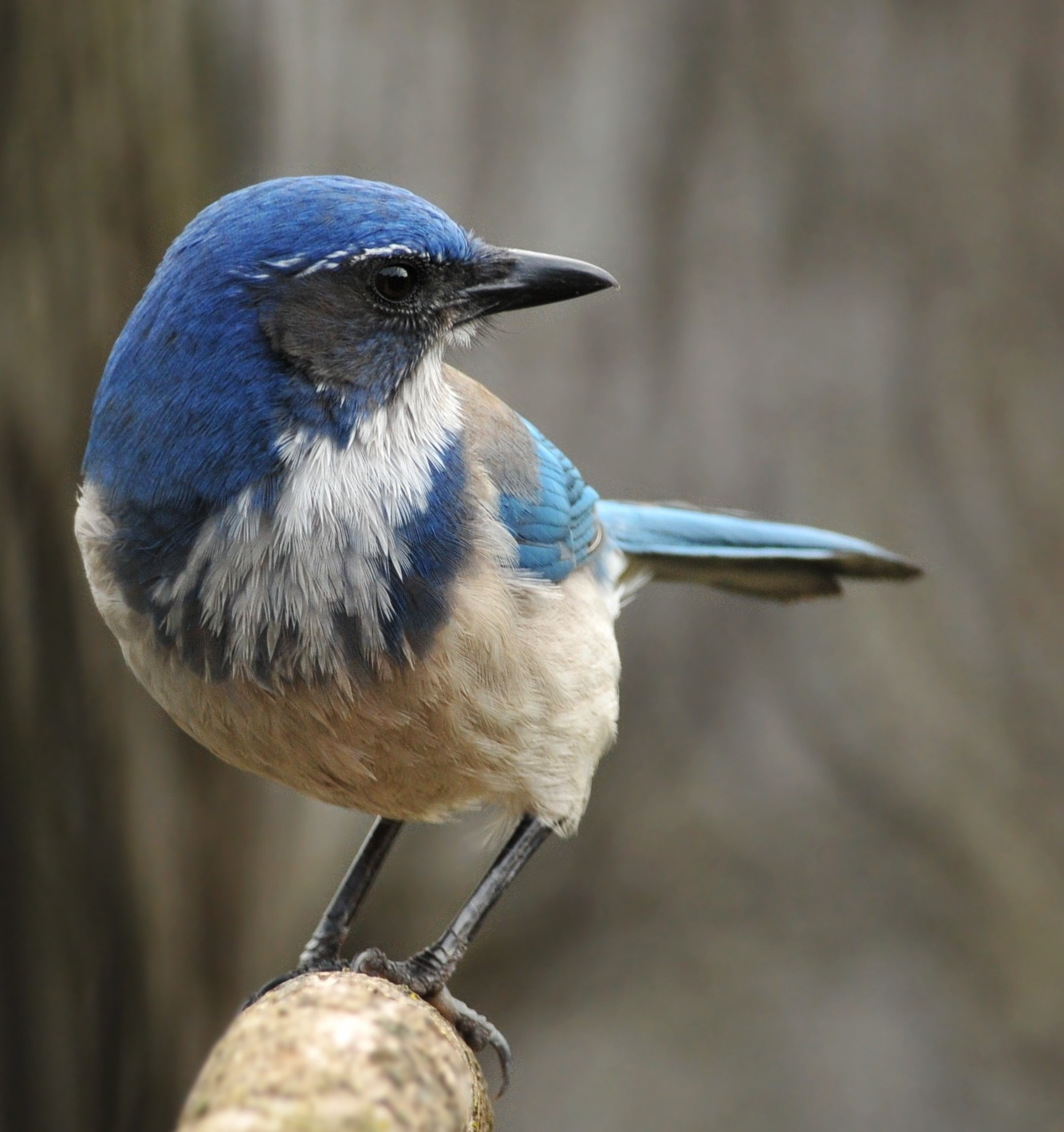
California scrub-jay

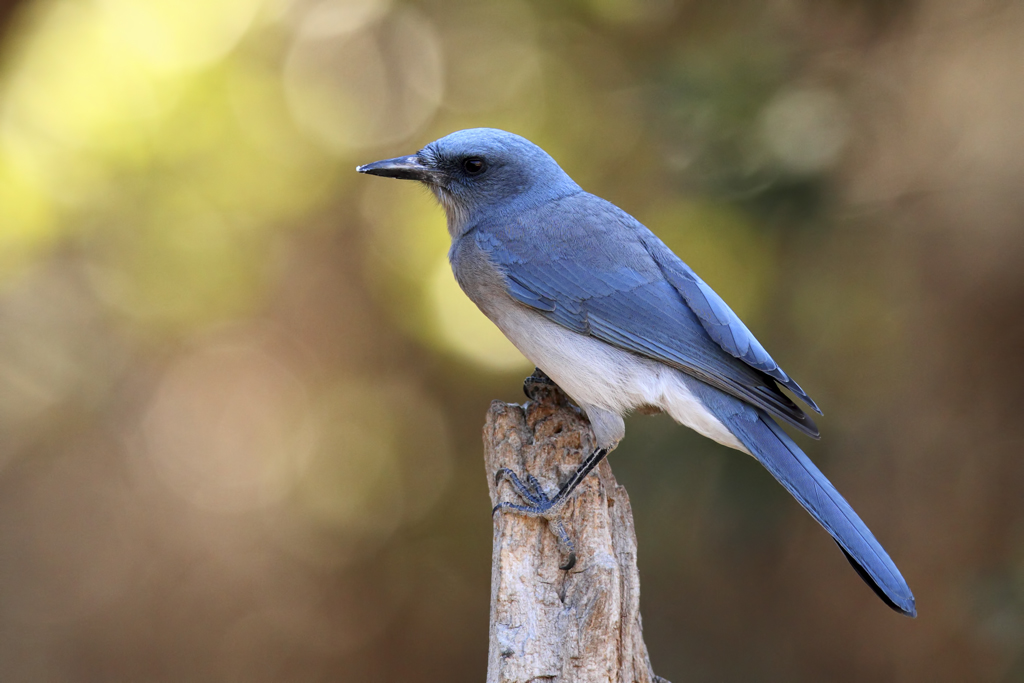
Mexican jay

== Penduline-tits ==
Order: Passeriformes Family: Remizidae

The penduline-tits are a group of small passerine birds related to the true tits. They are insectivores.

- Verdin, Auriparus flaviceps

== Tits, chickadees, and titmice ==
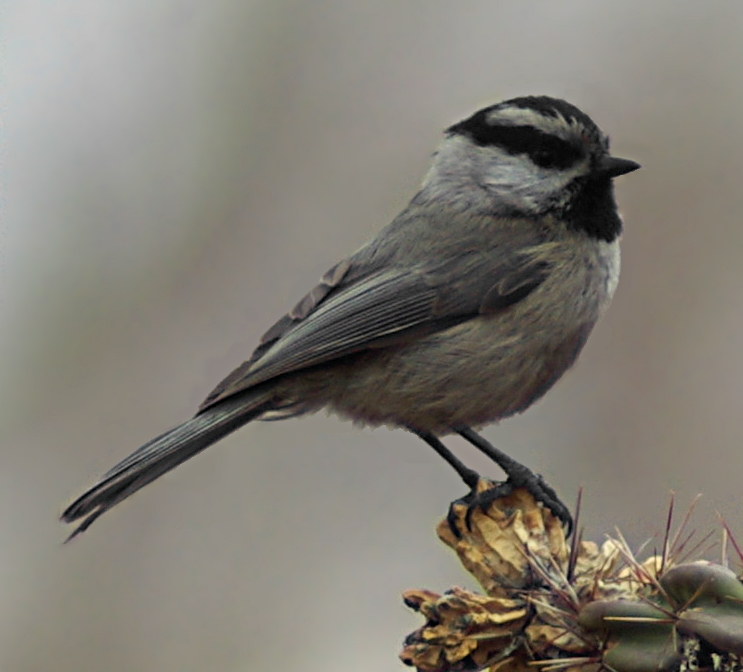
Mountain chickadee

Order: Passeriformes Family: Paridae

The Paridae are mainly small stocky woodland species with short stout bills. Some have crests. They are adaptable birds, with a mixed diet including seeds and insects.

- Mountain chickadee, Poecile gambeli
- Mexican chickadee, Poecile sclateri
- Bridled titmouse, Baeolophus wollweberi
- Oak titmouse, Baeolophus inornatus
- Juniper titmouse, Baeolophus ridgwayi (A)
- Black-crested titmouse, Baeolophus atricristatus

== Larks ==
Order: Passeriformes Family: Alaudidae

Larks are small terrestrial birds with often extravagant songs and display flights. Most larks are fairly dull in appearance. Their food is insects and seeds.

- Horned lark, Eremophila alpestris

== Swallows ==
Order: Passeriformes Family: Hirundinidae

The family Hirundinidae is adapted to aerial feeding. They have a slender streamlined body, long pointed wings, and a short bill with a wide gape. The feet are adapted to perching rather than walking, and the front toes are partially joined at the base.

- Bank swallow, Riparia riparia
- Tree swallow, Tachycineta bicolor
- Violet-green swallow, Tachycineta thalassina
- Mangrove swallow, Tachycineta albilinea
- Black-capped swallow, Notiochelidon pileata
- Blue-and-white swallow, Notiochelidon cyanoleuca (A)
- Northern rough-winged swallow, Stelgidopteryx serripennis
- Brown-chested martin, Progne tapera (A)
- Purple martin, Progne subis
- Gray-breasted martin, Progne chalybea
- Sinaloa martin, Progne sinaloae (breeding endemic) (vulnerable)
- Barn swallow, Hirundo rustica
- Cliff swallow, Petrochelidon pyrrhonota
- Cave swallow, Petrochelidon fulva

== Long-tailed tits ==
Order: Passeriformes Family: Aegithalidae

Long-tailed tits are a group of small passerine birds with medium to long tails. They make woven bag nests in trees. Most eat a mixed diet which includes insects.

- Bushtit, Psaltriparus minimus

== Leaf warblers ==
Order: Passeriformes Family: Phylloscopidae

Leaf warblers are a family of small insectivorous birds found mostly in Eurasia and ranging into Wallacea and Africa. The Arctic warbler breeds east into Alaska. The species are of various sizes, often green-plumaged above and yellow below, or more subdued with grayish-green to grayish-brown colors.

- Dusky warbler, Phylloscopus fuscatus (A)
- Yellow-browed warbler, Phylloscopus inornatus (A)
- Arctic warbler, Phylloscopus borealis (A)

== Sylviid warblers, parrotbills, and allies ==
Order: Passeriformes Family: Sylviidae

The family Sylviidae is a group of small insectivorous passerine birds. As one common name, "Old World warblers", implies, they mainly occur as breeding species in Europe, Asia and, to a lesser extent, Africa. Most are of generally undistinguished appearance, but many have distinctive songs.

- Wrentit, Chamaea fasciata

== White-eyes, yuhinas, and allies ==
Order: Passeriformes Family: Zosteropidae

The white-eyes are small and mostly undistinguished, their plumage above being generally some dull colour like greenish-olive, but some species have a white or bright yellow throat, breast or lower parts, and several have buff flanks. As their name suggests, many species have a white ring around each eye.

- Swinhoe's white-eye, Zosterops simplex (A)

== Kinglets ==
Order: Passeriformes Family: Regulidae

The kinglets, also called crests, are a small group of birds often included in the Old World warblers, but frequently given family status because they also resemble the titmice.

- Ruby-crowned kinglet, Corthylio calendula
- Golden-crowned kinglet, Regulus satrapa

== Waxwings ==
Order: Passeriformes Family: Bombycillidae

The waxwings are a group of birds with soft silky plumage and unique red tips to some of the wing feathers. In the Bohemian and cedar waxwings, these tips look like sealing wax and give the group its name. These are arboreal birds of northern forests. They live on insects in summer and berries in winter.

- Cedar waxwing, Bombycilla cedrorum

== Silky-flycatchers ==
Order: Passeriformes Family: Ptiliogonatidae

The silky-flycatchers are a small family of passerine birds which occur mainly in Central America. They are related to waxwings, and like that group have soft silky plumage, usually gray or pale yellow in color. They have small crests.

- Gray silky-flycatcher, Ptiliogonys cinereus
- Phainopepla, Phainopepla nitens

== Nuthatches ==
Order: Passeriformes Family: Sittidae

Nuthatches are small woodland birds. They have the unusual ability to climb down trees head first, unlike other birds which can only go upwards. Nuthatches have big heads, short tails, and powerful bills and feet.

- Red-breasted nuthatch, Sitta canadensis
- White-breasted nuthatch, Sitta carolinensis
- Pygmy nuthatch, Sitta pygmaea

== Treecreepers ==
Order: Passeriformes Family: Certhiidae

Treecreepers are small woodland birds, brown above and white below. They have thin pointed down-curved bills, which they use to extricate insects from bark. They have stiff tail feathers, like woodpeckers, which they use to support themselves on vertical trees.

- Brown creeper, Certhia americana

== Gnatcatchers ==
Order: Passeriformes Family: Polioptilidae

These dainty birds resemble Old World warblers in their build and habits, moving restlessly through the foliage seeking insects. The gnatcatchers and gnatwrens are mainly soft bluish gray in color and have the typical insectivore's long sharp bill. They are birds of fairly open woodland or scrub which nest in bushes or trees.

- Long-billed gnatwren, Ramphocaenus melanurus
- Yucatan gnatcatcher, Polioptila albiventris (E)
- White-browed gnatcatcher, Polioptila bilineata
- Blue-gray gnatcatcher, Polioptila caerulea
- Black-tailed gnatcatcher, Polioptila melanura
- California gnatcatcher, Polioptila californica
- Black-capped gnatcatcher, Polioptila nigriceps
- White-lored gnatcatcher, Polioptila albiloris

== Wrens ==
Order: Passeriformes Family: Troglodytidae

The wrens are mainly small and inconspicuous except for their loud songs. These birds have short wings and thin down-turned bills. Several species often hold their tails upright. All are insectivorous.

- Rock wren, Salpinctes obsoletus
- Nightingale wren, Microcerculus philomela
- Canyon wren, Catherpes mexicanus
- Sumichrast's wren, Hylorchilus sumichrasti (E) (near-threatened)
- Nava's wren, Hylorchilus navai (E) (vulnerable)
- House wren, Troglodytes aedon
- Socorro wren, Troglodytes sissonii (E) (near-threatened)
- Clarion wren, Troglodytes tanneri (E) (vulnerable)
- Rufous-browed wren, Troglodytes rufociliatus
- Pacific wren, Troglodytes pacificus (A)
- Winter wren, Troglodytes hiemalis (A)
- Sedge wren, Cistothorus platensis
- Grass wren, Cistothorus platensis
- Marsh wren, Cistothorus palustris
- Carolina wren, Thryothorus ludovicianus
- Bewick's wren, Thryomanes bewickii
- Band-backed wren, Campylorhynchus zonatus
- Gray-barred wren, Campylorhynchus megalopterus (E)
- Giant wren, Campylorhynchus chiapensis (E)
- Rufous-naped wren, Campylorhynchus rufinucha
- Spotted wren, Campylorhynchus gularis (E)
- Boucard's wren, Campylorhynchus jocosus (E)
- Yucatan wren, Campylorhynchus yucatanicus (E) (near-threatened)
- Cactus wren, Campylorhynchus brunneicapillus
- Spot-breasted wren, Pheugopedius maculipectus
- Happy wren, Pheugopedius felix (E)
- Rufous-and-white wren, Thryophilus rufalbus
- Sinaloa wren, Thryophilus sinaloa (E)
- Banded wren, Thryophilus pleurostictus
- Cabanis's wren, Cantorchilus modestus
- White-bellied wren, Uropsila leucogastra
- White-breasted wood-wren, Henicorhina leucosticta
- Gray-breasted wood-wren, Henicorhina leucophrys

== Mockingbirds and thrashers ==
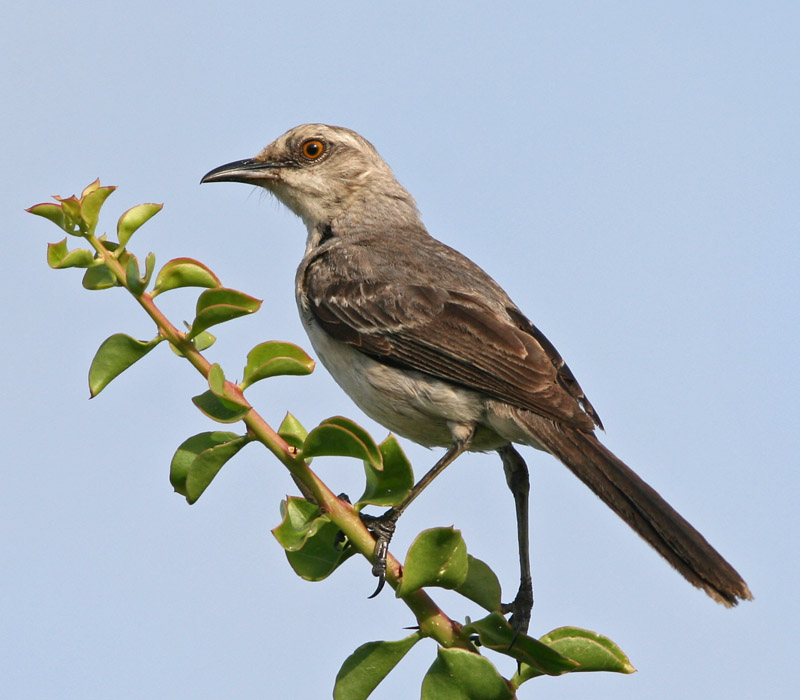
Tropical mockingbird

Order: Passeriformes Family: Mimidae

The mimids are a family of passerine birds that includes thrashers, mockingbirds, tremblers, and the New World catbirds. These birds are notable for their vocalizations, especially their ability to mimic a wide variety of birds and other sounds heard outdoors. Their coloring tends towards dull grays and browns. Mexico has the greatest diversity of this family of any country.

- Blue mockingbird, Melanotis caerulescens (E)
- Blue-and-white mockingbird, Melanotis hypoleucus
- Black catbird, Melanoptila glabrirostris (near-threatened)
- Gray catbird, Dumetella carolinensis
- Curve-billed thrasher, Toxostoma curvirostre
- Ocellated thrasher, Toxostoma ocellatum (E)
- Brown thrasher, Toxostoma rufum (A)
- Long-billed thrasher, Toxostoma longirostre
- Cozumel thrasher, Toxostoma guttatum (E) (critically endangered)
- Bendire's thrasher, Toxostoma bendirei (vulnerable)
- Gray thrasher, Toxostoma cinereum (E)
- California thrasher, Toxostoma redivivum
- LeConte's thrasher, Toxostoma lecontei
- Crissal thrasher, Toxostoma crissale
- Sage thrasher, Oreoscoptes montanus
- Socorro mockingbird, Mimus graysoni (E) (critically endangered)
- Tropical mockingbird, Mimus gilvus
- Northern mockingbird, Mimus polyglottos

== Starlings ==
Order: Passeriformes Family: Sturnidae

Starlings are small to medium-sized passerine birds. Their flight is strong and direct and they are very gregarious. Their preferred habitat is fairly open country. They eat insects and fruit. Plumage is typically dark with a metallic sheen.

- European starling, Sturnus vulgaris (I)

== Dippers ==
Order: Passeriformes Family: Cinclidae

Dippers are a group of perching birds whose habitat includes aquatic environments in the Americas, Europe, and Asia. They are named for their bobbing or dipping movements.

- American dipper, Cinclus mexicanus

== Thrushes and allies ==
Order: Passeriformes Family: Turdidae

The thrushes are a group of passerine birds that occur mainly in the Old World. They are plump, soft plumaged, small to medium-sized insectivores or sometimes omnivores, often feeding on the ground. Many have attractive songs.

- Eastern bluebird, Sialia sialis
- Western bluebird, Sialia mexicana
- Mountain bluebird, Sialia currucoides
- Townsend's solitaire, Myadestes townsendi
- Brown-backed solitaire, Myadestes occidentalis
- Slate-colored solitaire, Myadestes unicolor
- Orange-billed nightingale-thrush, Catharus aurantiirostris
- Russet nightingale-thrush, Catharus occidentalis (E)
- Ruddy-capped nightingale-thrush, Catharus frantzii
- Black-headed nightingale-thrush, Catharus mexicanus
- Yellow-throated nightingale-thrush, Catharus dryas
- Veery, Catharus fuscescens
- Gray-cheeked thrush, Catharus minimus
- Swainson's thrush, Catharus ustulatus
- Hermit thrush, Catharus guttatus
- Wood thrush, Hylocichla mustelina (near-threatened)
- Black thrush, Turdus infuscatus
- Mountain thrush, Turdus plebejus
- Clay-colored thrush, Turdus grayi
- White-throated thrush, Turdus assimilis
- Rufous-backed robin, Turdus rufopalliatus (E)
- Rufous-collared robin, Turdus rufitorques
- American robin, Turdus migratorius
- Varied thrush, Ixoreus naevius
- Aztec thrush, Ridgwayia pinicola (E)

== Old World flycatchers ==
Order: Passeriformes Family: Muscicapidae

Old World flycatchers are a large group of small passerine birds native to the Old World. They are mainly small arboreal insectivores. The appearance of these birds is highly varied, but they mostly have weak songs and harsh calls.

- Red-flanked bluetail, Tarsiger cyanurus (A)
- Northern wheatear, Oenanthe oenanthe (A)

== Olive warbler ==
Order: Passeriformes Family: Peucedramidae

The olive warbler is a small passerine bird, the only member of the family Peucedramidae. It is a long-winged bird with a gray body and wings with some olive-green and two white bars. The male's head and breast are orange, the female's yellow.

- Olive warbler, Peucedramus taeniatus

== Waxbills and allies ==
Order: Passeriformes Family: Estrildidae

The estrildid finches are small passerine birds of the Old World tropics and Australasia. They are gregarious and often colonial seed eaters with short thick but pointed bills. They are all similar in structure and habits, but have a wide variation in plumage colors and pattern.

- Scaly-breasted munia, Lonchura punctulata (I)
- Tricolored munia, Lonchura malacca (I)
- Chestnut munia, Lonchura atricapilla (I)

== Old World sparrows ==
Order: Passeriformes Family: Passeridae

Sparrows are small passerine birds. In general, sparrows tend to be small, plump, brown or gray birds with short tails and short powerful beaks. Sparrows are seed eaters, but they also consume small insects.

- House sparrow, Passer domesticus (I)

== Wagtails and pipits ==
Order: Passeriformes Family: Motacillidae

Motacillidae is a family of small passerine birds with medium to long tails. They include the wagtails, longclaws, and pipits. They are slender ground-feeding insectivores of open country.

- Eastern yellow wagtail, Motacilla tschutschensis (A)
- White wagtail, Motacilla alba (A)
- Olive-backed pipit, Anthus hodgsoni (A)
- Red-throated pipit, Anthus cervinus (A)
- American pipit, Anthus rubescens
- Sprague's pipit, Anthus spragueii (vulnerable)

== Finches, euphonias, and allies ==
Order: Passeriformes Family: Fringillidae

Finches are seed-eating passerine birds that are small to moderately large and have a strong beak, usually conical and in some species very large. All have twelve tail feathers and nine primaries. These birds have a bouncing flight with alternating bouts of flapping and gliding on closed wings, and most sing well.

- Elegant euphonia, Chlorophonia elegantissima
- Blue-crowned chlorophonia, Chlorophonia occipitalis
- West Mexican euphonia, Euphonia godmani (E)
- Scrub euphonia, Euphonia affinis
- White-vented euphonia, Euphonia minuta
- Yellow-throated euphonia, Euphonia hirundinacea
- Olive-backed euphonia, Euphonia gouldi
- Hooded grosbeak, Coccothraustes abeillei
- Evening grosbeak, Coccothraustes vespertinus (vulnerable)
- House finch, Haemorhous mexicanus
- Purple finch, Haemorhous purpureus
- Cassin's finch, Haemorhous cassinii
- Red crossbill, Loxia curvirostra
- Pine siskin, Spinus pinus
- Black-capped siskin, Spinus atriceps
- Black-headed siskin, Spinus notatus
- Lesser goldfinch, Spinus psaltria
- Lawrence's goldfinch, Spinus lawrencei
- American goldfinch, Spinus tristis

== Thrush-tanager ==
Order: Passeriformes Family: Rhodinocichlidae

This species was historically placed in family Thraupidae. It was placed in its own family in 2017.

- Rosy thrush-tanager, Rhodinocichla rosea

== Longspurs and snow buntings ==
Order: Passeriformes Family: Calcariidae

The Calcariidae are a group of passerine birds that had been traditionally grouped with the New World sparrows, but differ in a number of respects and are usually found in open grassy areas.

- Lapland longspur, Calcarius lapponicus (A)
- Chestnut-collared longspur, Calcarius ornatus (near-threatened)
- Thick-billed longspur, Rhynchophanes mccownii

== Old World buntings ==
Order: Passeriformes Family: Emberizidae

Emberizidae is a family of passerine birds containing a single genus. Until 2017, the New World sparrows (Passerellidae) were also considered part of this family.

- Little bunting, Emberiza pusilla (A)

== New World sparrows ==
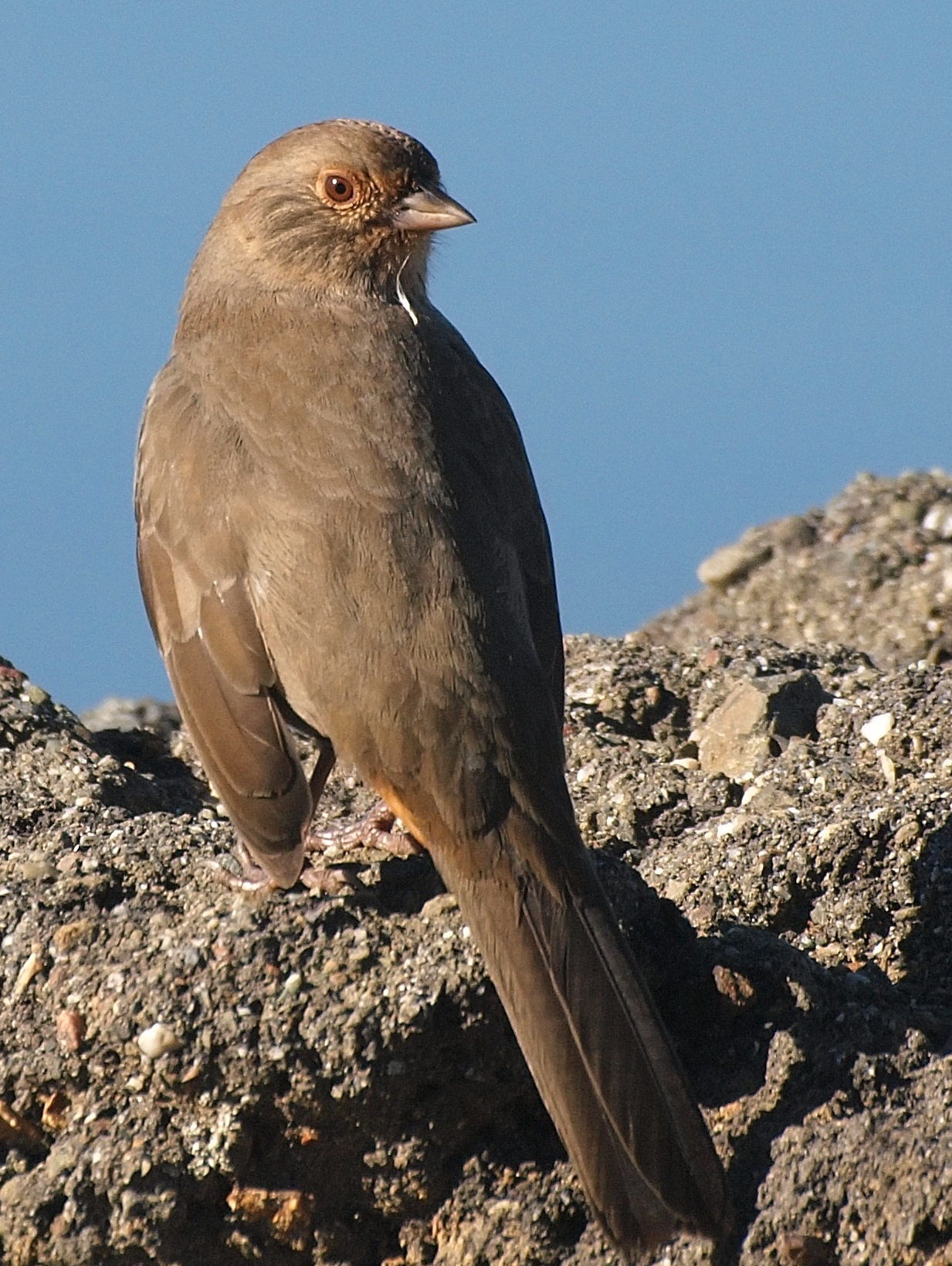
California towhee

Order: Passeriformes Family: Passerellidae

Until 2017, these species were considered part of the family Emberizidae. Most of the species are known as sparrows, but these birds are not closely related to the Old World sparrows which are in the family Passeridae. Many of these have distinctive head patterns.

- Common chlorospingus, Chlorospingus flavopectus
- Rufous-winged sparrow, Peucaea carpalis
- Cinnamon-tailed sparrow, Peucaea sumichrasti (E) (near-threatened)
- Stripe-headed sparrow, Peucaea ruficauda
- Black-chested sparrow, Peucaea humeralis (E)
- Bridled sparrow, Peucaea mystacalis (E)
- Botteri's sparrow, Peucaea botterii
- Cassin's sparrow, Peucaea cassinii
- Grasshopper sparrow, Ammodramus savannarum
- Olive sparrow, Arremonops rufivirgatus
- Five-striped sparrow, Amphispizopsis quinquestriata
- Green-backed sparrow, Arremonops chloronotus
- Black-throated sparrow, Amphispiza bilineata
- Lark sparrow, Chondestes grammacus
- Lark bunting, Calamospiza melanocorys
- Chipping sparrow, Spizella passerina
- Clay-colored sparrow, Spizella pallida
- Black-chinned sparrow, Spizella atrogularis
- Field sparrow, Spizella pusilla
- Brewer's sparrow, Spizella breweri
- Worthen's sparrow, Spizella wortheni (E) (endangered)
- Orange-billed sparrow, Arremon aurantiirostris
- Green-striped brushfinch, Arremon virenticeps (E)
- Chestnut-capped brushfinch, Arremon brunneinucha
- Fox sparrow, Passerella iliaca
- Guadalupe junco, Junco insularis (E) (endangered)
- Dark-eyed junco, Junco hyemalis
- Yellow-eyed junco, Junco phaeonotus
- Baird's junco, Junco bairdi (E) (near-threatened)
- Rufous-collared sparrow, Zonotrichia capensis
- White-crowned sparrow, Zonotrichia leucophrys
- Golden-crowned sparrow, Zonotrichia atricapilla
- Harris's sparrow, Zonotrichia querula (A) (near-threatened)
- White-throated sparrow, Zonotrichia albicollis
- Sagebrush sparrow, Artemisiospiza nevadensis
- Bell's sparrow, Artemisiospiza belli
- Striped sparrow, Oriturus superciliosus (E)
- Vesper sparrow, Pooecetes gramineus
- LeConte's sparrow, Ammospiza leconteii (A)
- Seaside sparrow, Ammospiza maritima (A)
- Nelson's sparrow, Ammospiza nelsoni (A)
- Baird's sparrow, Centronyx bairdii
- Savannah sparrow, Passerculus sandwichensis
- Sierra Madre sparrow, Xenospiza baileyi (E) (endangered)
- Song sparrow, Melospiza melodia
- Lincoln's sparrow, Melospiza lincolnii
- Swamp sparrow, Melospiza georgiana
- Rusty-crowned ground-sparrow, Melozone kieneri (E)
- Canyon towhee, Melozone fusca
- White-throated towhee, Melozone albicollis (E)
- Abert's towhee, Melozone aberti
- California towhee, Melozone crissalis
- White-eared ground-sparrow, Melozone leucotis
- White-faced ground-sparrow, Melozone biarcuata
- Rusty sparrow, Aimophila rufescens
- Rufous-crowned sparrow, Aimophila ruficeps
- Oaxaca sparrow, Aimophila notosticta (E)
- Green-tailed towhee, Pipilo chlorurus
- Spotted towhee, Pipilo maculatus
- Collared towhee, Pipilo ocai (E)
- Rufous-capped brushfinch, Atlapetes pileatus (E)
- White-naped brushfinch, Atlapetes albinucha

== Spindalises ==
Order: Passeriformes Family: Spindalidae

The members of this small family are native to the Greater Antilles. One species is common on Cozumel.

- Western spindalis, Spindalis zena

== Yellow-breasted chat ==
Order: Passeriformes Family: Icteriidae

This species was historically placed in the wood-warblers (Parulidae) but nonetheless most authorities were unsure if it belonged there. It was placed in its own family in 2017.

- Yellow-breasted chat, Icteria virens

== Troupials and allies ==
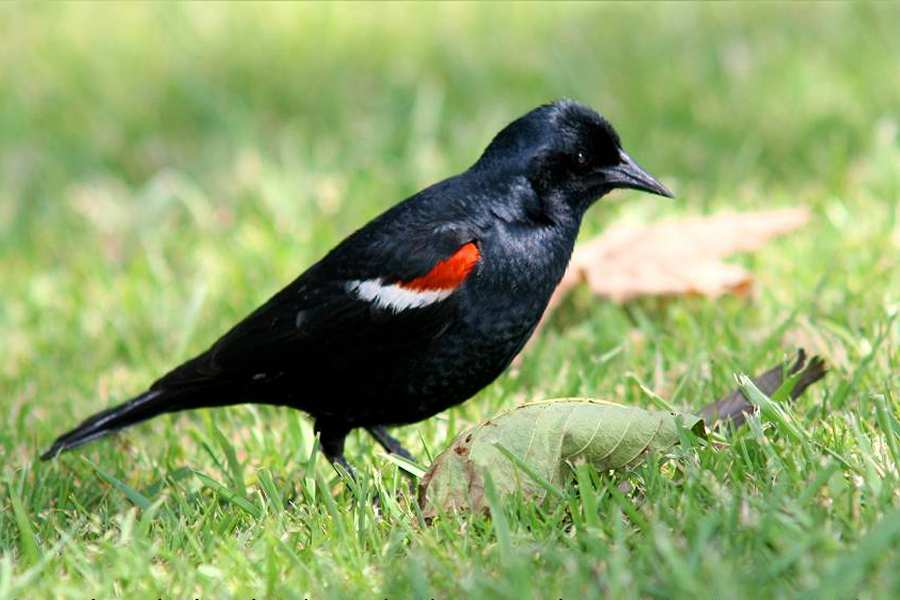
Tricolored blackbird

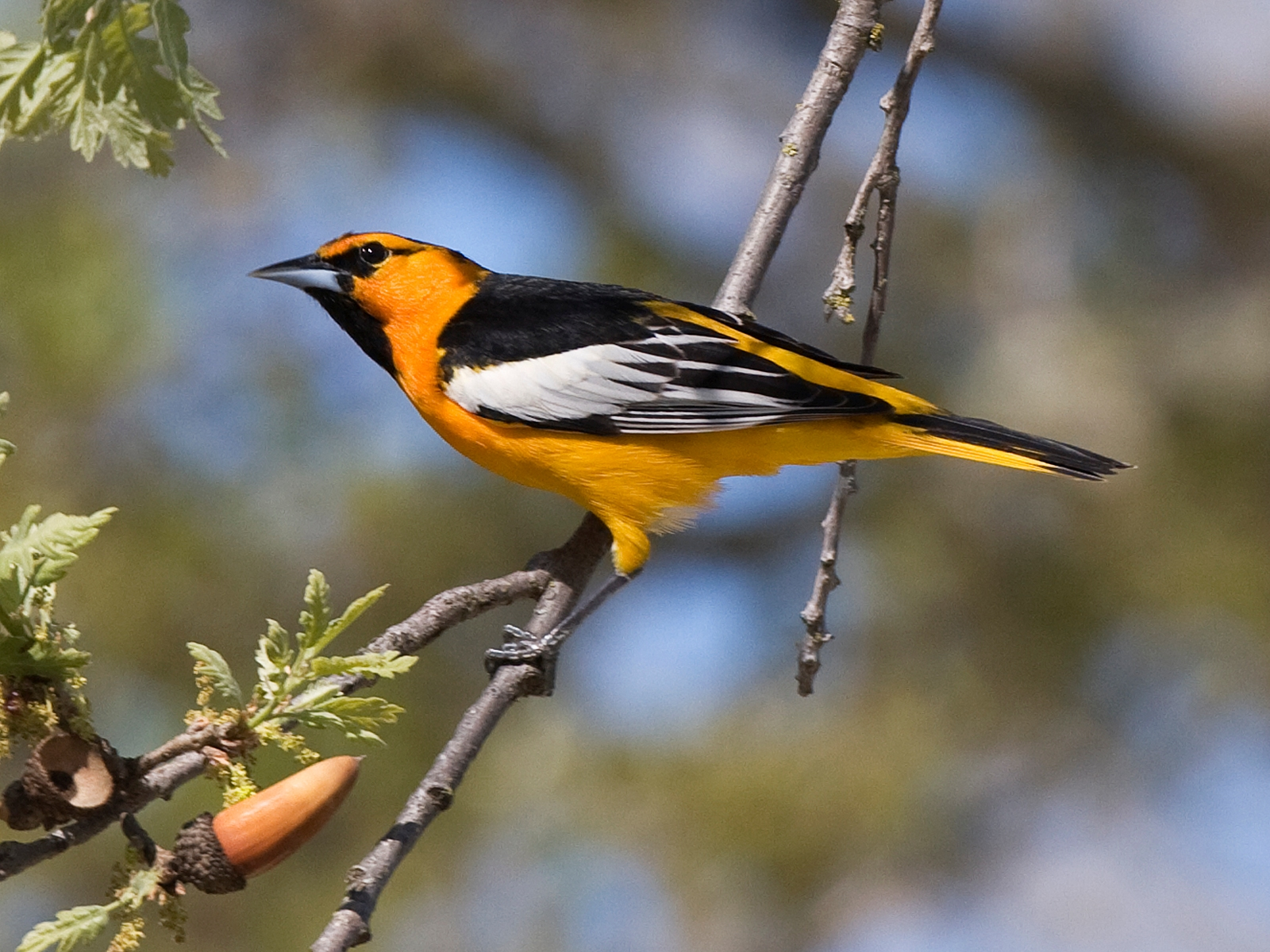
Bullock's oriole

Order: Passeriformes Family: Icteridae

The icterids are a group of small to medium-sized, often colorful, passerine birds restricted to the New World and include the grackles, New World blackbirds, and New World orioles. Most species have black as the predominant plumage color, often enlivened by yellow, orange, or red.

- Yellow-headed blackbird, Xanthocephalus xanthocephalus
- Bobolink, Dolichonyx oryzivorus (A)
- Chihuahuan meadowlark, Sturnella lilianae
- Eastern meadowlark, Sturnella magna (near-threatened)
- Western meadowlark, Sturnella neglecta
- Yellow-billed cacique, Amblycercus holosericeus
- Yellow-winged cacique, Cassiculus melanicterus (E)
- Chestnut-headed oropendola, Psarocolius wagleri
- Montezuma oropendola, Psarocolius montezuma
- Black-vented oriole, Icterus wagleri
- Bar-winged oriole, Icterus maculialatus
- Black-cowled oriole, Icterus prosthemelas
- Orchard oriole, Icterus spurius
- Hooded oriole, Icterus cucullatus
- Yellow-backed oriole, Icterus chrysater
- Yellow-tailed oriole, Icterus mesomelas
- Streak-backed oriole, Icterus pustulatus
- Bullock's oriole, Icterus bullockii
- Orange oriole, Icterus auratus (E)
- Spot-breasted oriole, Icterus pectoralis
- Altamira oriole, Icterus gularis
- Audubon's oriole, Icterus graduacauda
- Baltimore oriole, Icterus galbula
- Black-backed oriole, Icterus abeillei (E)
- Scott's oriole, Icterus parisorum
- Red-winged blackbird, Agelaius phoeniceus
- Tricolored blackbird, Agelaius tricolor (endangered)
- Shiny cowbird, Molothrus bonariensis (A)
- Bronzed cowbird, Molothrus aeneus
- Brown-headed cowbird, Molothrus ater
- Giant cowbird, Molothrus oryzivorus
- Melodious blackbird, Dives dives
- Rusty blackbird, Euphagus carolinus (A) (vulnerable)
- Brewer's blackbird, Euphagus cyanocephalus
- Common grackle, Quiscalus quiscula (A) (near-threatened)
- Great-tailed grackle, Quiscalus mexicanus
- Slender-billed grackle, Quiscalus palustris (E) (extinct)

== New World warblers ==
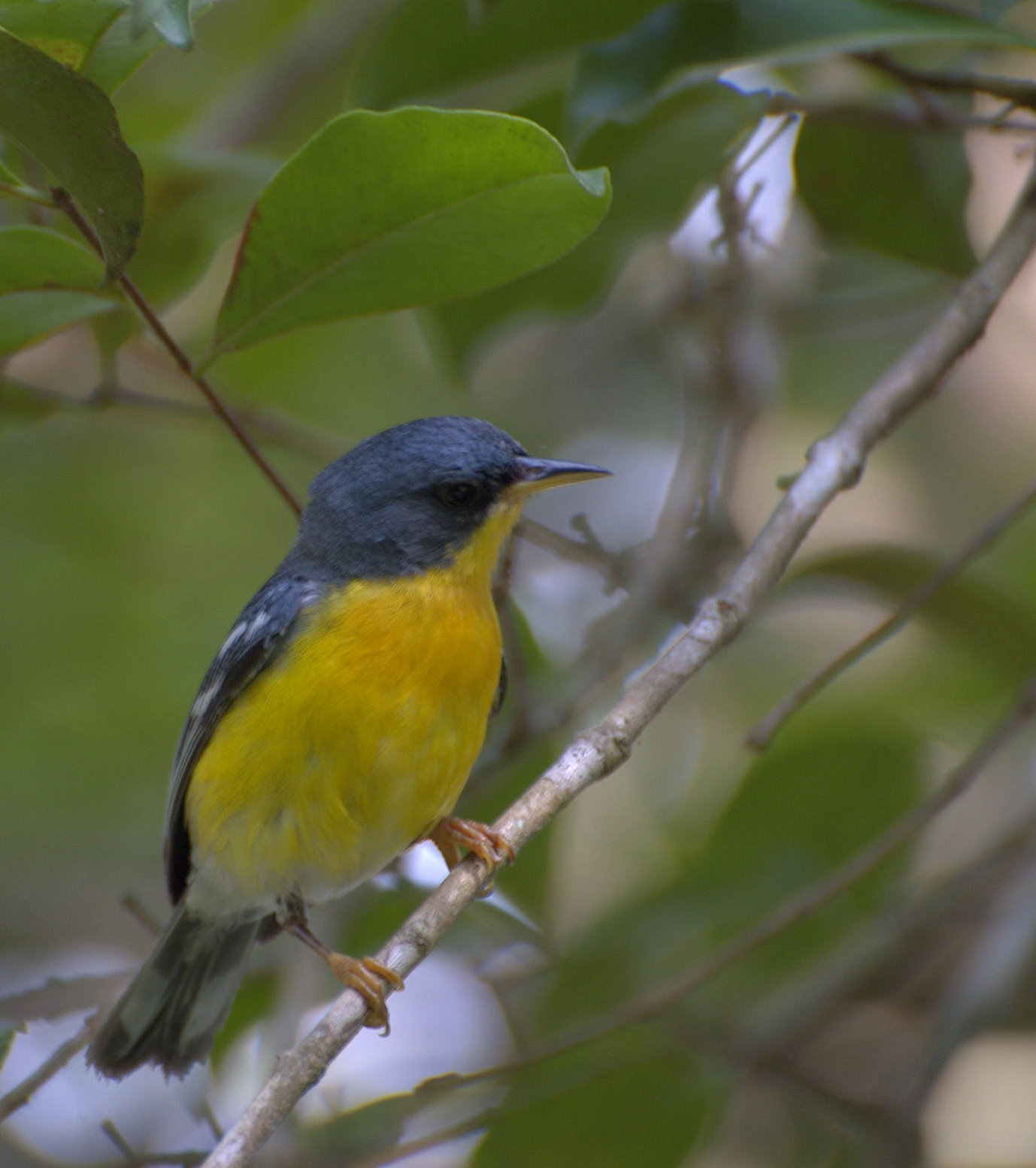
Tropical parula

Order: Passeriformes Family: Parulidae

The New World warblers are a group of small, often colorful, passerine birds restricted to the New World. Most are arboreal, but some are terrestrial. Most members of this family are insectivores. Mexico has the greatest diversity of New World warblers on earth.

- Ovenbird, Seiurus aurocapilla
- Worm-eating warbler, Helmitheros vermivorum
- Louisiana waterthrush, Parkesia motacilla
- Northern waterthrush, Parkesia noveboracensis
- Golden-winged warbler, Vermivora chrysoptera
- Blue-winged warbler, Vermivora cyanoptera (near-threatened)
- Black-and-white warbler, Mniotilta varia
- Prothonotary warbler, Protonotaria citrea
- Swainson's warbler, Limnothlypis swainsonii
- Crescent-chested warbler, Leiothlypis superciliosa
- Tennessee warbler, Leiothlypis peregrina
- Orange-crowned warbler, Leiothlypis celata
- Colima warbler, Leiothlypis crissalis
- Lucy's warbler, Leiothlypis luciae
- Nashville warbler, Leiothlypis ruficapilla
- Virginia's warbler, Leiothlypis virginiae
- Connecticut warbler, Oporornis agilis (A)
- Gray-crowned yellowthroat, Geothlypis poliocephala
- MacGillivray's warbler, Geothlypis tolmiei
- Mourning warbler, Geothlypis philadelphia
- Kentucky warbler, Geothlypis formosa
- Black-polled yellowthroat, Geothlypis speciosa (E) (endangered)
- Belding's yellowthroat, Geothlypis beldingi (E) (endangered)
- Altamira yellowthroat, Geothlypis flavovelata (E) (vulnerable)
- Common yellowthroat, Geothlypis trichas
- Hooded yellowthroat, Geothlypis nelsoni (E)
- Hooded warbler, Setophaga citrina
- American redstart, Setophaga ruticilla
- Cape May warbler, Setophaga tigrina
- Cerulean warbler, Setophaga cerulea (vulnerable)
- Northern parula, Setophaga americana
- Tropical parula, Setophaga pitiayumi
- Magnolia warbler, Setophaga magnolia
- Bay-breasted warbler, Setophaga castanea
- Blackburnian warbler, Setophaga fusca
- Yellow warbler, Setophaga petechia
- Chestnut-sided warbler, Setophaga pensylvanica
- Blackpoll warbler, Setophaga striata (A)
- Black-throated blue warbler, Setophaga caerulescens
- Palm warbler, Setophaga palmarum
- Pine warbler, Setophaga pinus (A)
- Yellow-rumped warbler, Setophaga coronata
- Yellow-throated warbler, Setophaga dominica
- Prairie warbler, Setophaga discolor
- Grace's warbler, Setophaga graciae
- Black-throated gray warbler, Setophaga nigrescens
- Townsend's warbler, Setophaga townsendi
- Hermit warbler, Setophaga occidentalis
- Golden-cheeked warbler, Setophaga chrysoparia (endangered)
- Black-throated green warbler, Setophaga virens
- Fan-tailed warbler, Basileuterus lachrymosus
- Rufous-capped warbler, Basileuterus rufifrons
- Chestnut-capped warbler, Basileuterus delattrii
- Golden-browed warbler, Basileuterus belli
- Golden-crowned warbler, Basileuterus culicivorus
- Canada warbler, Cardellina canadensis
- Wilson's warbler, Cardellina pusilla
- Red-faced warbler, Cardellina rubrifrons
- Red warbler, Cardellina rubra (E)
- Pink-headed warbler, Cardellina versicolor (vulnerable)
- Painted redstart, Myioborus pictus
- Slate-throated redstart, Myioborus miniatus

== Cardinals and allies ==
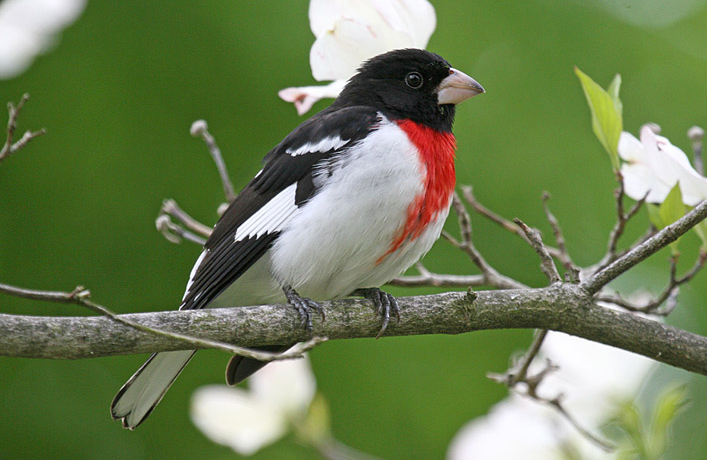
Rose-breasted grosbeak

Order: Passeriformes Family: Cardinalidae

The cardinals are a family of robust, seed-eating birds with strong bills. They are typically associated with open woodland. The sexes usually have distinct plumages. Mexico has the greatest diversity of this family of any country.

- Rose-throated tanager, Piranga roseogularis
- Hepatic tanager, Piranga flava
- Summer tanager, Piranga rubra
- Scarlet tanager, Piranga olivacea
- Western tanager, Piranga ludoviciana
- Flame-colored tanager, Piranga bidentata
- White-winged tanager, Piranga leucoptera
- Red-headed tanager, Piranga erythrocephala (E)
- Red-crowned ant-tanager, Habia rubica
- Red-throated ant-tanager, Habia fuscicauda
- Black-faced grosbeak, Caryothraustes poliogaster
- Crimson-collared grosbeak, Rhodothraupis celaeno (E)
- Northern cardinal, Cardinalis cardinalis
- Pyrrhuloxia, Cardinalis sinuatus
- Yellow grosbeak, Pheucticus chrysopeplus
- Rose-breasted grosbeak, Pheucticus ludovicianus
- Black-headed grosbeak, Pheucticus melanocephalus
- Red-breasted chat, Granatellus venustus (E)
- Gray-throated chat, Granatellus sallaei
- Blue seedeater, Amaurospiza concolor
- Blue-black grosbeak, Cyanoloxia cyanoides
- Blue bunting, Cyanocompsa parellina
- Blue grosbeak, Passerina caerulea
- Lazuli bunting, Passerina amoena
- Indigo bunting, Passerina cyanea
- Rose-bellied bunting, Passerina rositae (E) (near-threatened)
- Orange-breasted bunting, Passerina leclancherii (E)
- Varied bunting, Passerina versicolor
- Painted bunting, Passerina ciris (near-threatened)
- Dickcissel, Spiza americana

== Tanagers and allies ==
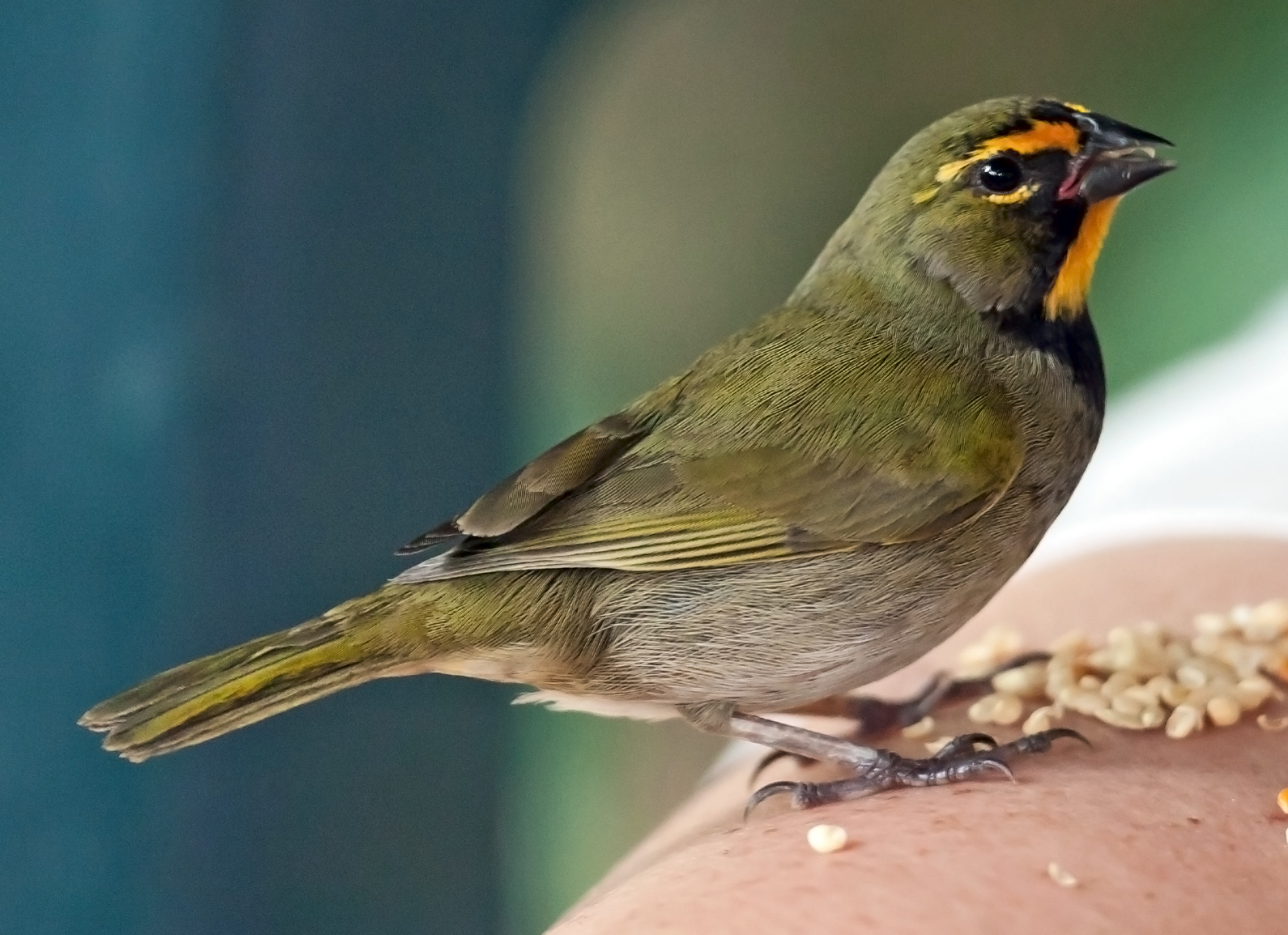
Yellow-faced grassquit

Order: Passeriformes Family: Thraupidae

The tanagers are a large group of small to medium-sized passerine birds restricted to the New World, mainly in the tropics. Many species are brightly colored. As a family they are omnivorous, but individual species specialize in eating fruits, seeds, insects, or other types of food. Most have short, rounded wings.

- Azure-rumped tanager, Poecilostreptus cabanisi (endangered)
- Golden-hooded tanager, Stilpnia larvata
- Blue-gray tanager, Thraupis episcopus
- Yellow-winged tanager, Thraupis abbas
- Grassland yellow-finch, Sicalis luteola
- Slaty finch, Haplospiza rustica (A)
- Cinnamon-bellied flowerpiercer, Diglossa baritula
- Green honeycreeper, Chlorophanes spiza
- Blue-black grassquit, Volatinia jacarina
- Gray-headed tanager, Eucometis penicillata
- Black-throated shrike-tanager, Lanio aurantius
- Crimson-collared tanager, Ramphocelus sanguinolentus
- Scarlet-rumped tanager, Ramphocelus passerinii
- Shining honeycreeper, Cyanerpes lucidus (A)
- Red-legged honeycreeper, Cyanerpes cyaneus
- Bananaquit, Coereba flaveola
- Yellow-faced grassquit, Tiaris olivacea
- Thick-billed seed-finch, Sporophila funereus
- Variable seedeater, Sporophila corvina
- Slate-colored seedeater, Sporophila schistacea (A)
- Cinnamon-rumped seedeater, Sporophila torqueola (E)
- Morelet's seedeater, Sporophila morelleti
- Ruddy-breasted seedeater, Sporophila minuta
- Buff-throated saltator, Saltator maximus
- Black-headed saltator, Saltator atriceps
- Olive-gray saltator, Saltator olivascens
- Cinnamon-bellied saltator, Saltator grandis

== See also ==
- List of birds
- Lists of birds by region
