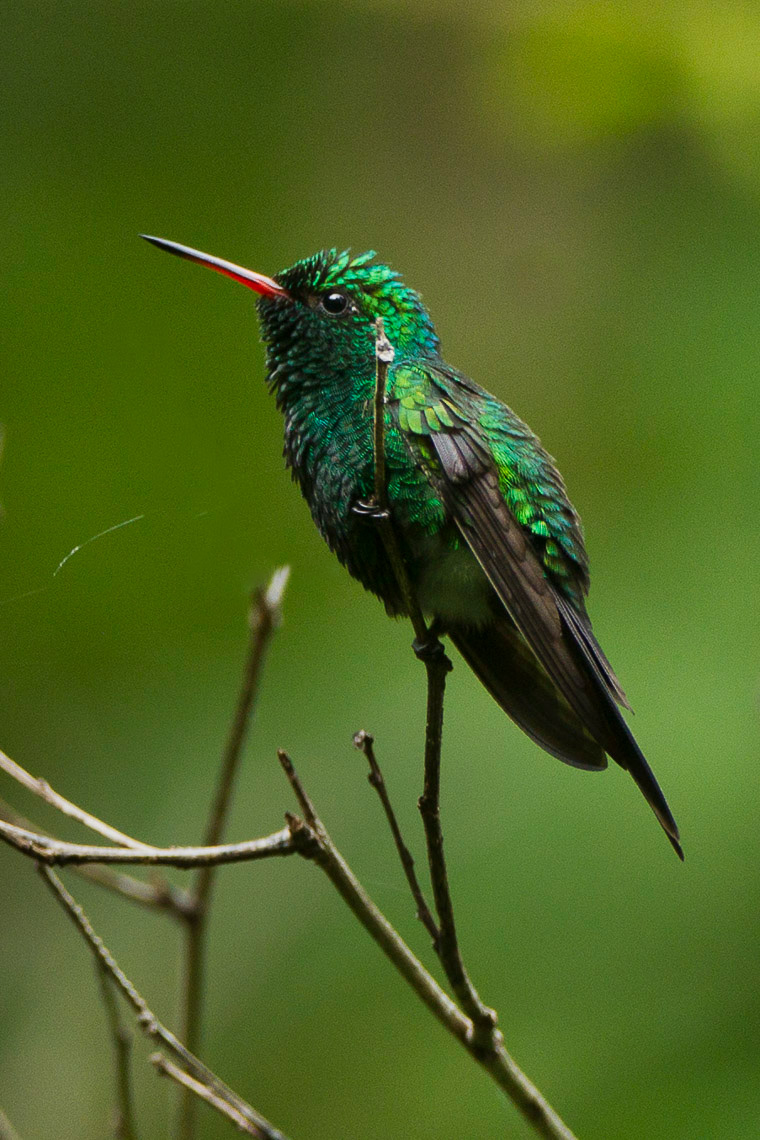

Conservation status
- Least Concern (IUCN 3.1)
- CITES Appendix II

Scientific classification
- Kingdom: Animalia
- Phylum: Chordata
- Class: Aves
- Order: Apodiformes
- Family: Trochilidae
- Genus: Cynanthus
- Species: C. auriceps

Binomial name
- Cynanthus auriceps (Gould, 1852)

Synonyms
- Trochilus auriceps; Chlorostilbon auriceps

= Golden-crowned emerald =

Species of hummingbird

The golden-crowned emerald (Cynanthus auriceps) is a species of hummingbird in the "emeralds", tribe Trochilini of subfamily Trochilinae. It is endemic to western Mexico.

== Taxonomy and systematics ==
The golden-crowned emerald was originally described in genus Trochilus. Since then it has variously been classified as a subspecies of what is now Canivet's emerald (Cynanthus canivetii) and included in blue-tailed emerald (Chlorostilbon mellisugus). In 2020 the North American Classification Committee of the American Ornithological Society (AOS), the International Ornithological Committee (IOC), and the Clements taxonomy placed it in genus Cynanthus with Carnivet's emerald, broad-billed hummingbird (C. latirostris), Turquoise-crowned hummingbird (C. doubledayi), and the Cozumel emerald (C. forficatus). The 2020 Version 5 of BirdLife International's Handbook of the Birds of the World retains it in Chlorostilbon.

The golden-crowned emerald is monotypic.

== Description ==
The golden-crowned emerald is 7.5 to 9.5 cm (3.0 to 3.7 in) long and weighs about 2.2 g (0.078 oz). The adult male's crown is brilliant golden green and the rest of its upperparts duller golden green to bronzy green. Its underparts transition from an almost pure green on the chin and throat to brilliant golden green at the vent. The tail is long and deeply forked; its feathers are black with a violet-bluish gloss, and the central three pairs have broad brownish gray tips. The adult female's upperparts are like the male's. Its underparts are light gray that is palest on the belly and vent. Its cheeks are dusky with a grayish white streak behind the eye. Its tail is also forked but much shorter than the male's; the central feathers are bluish green to bronze green and most have a black band near the end and gray tips. The male's bill is red with a black tip, the female's mandible is red with a black tip and the maxilla is black.

== Distribution and habitat ==
The golden-crowned emerald is found in western Mexico from Sinaloa south to eastern Oaxaca and also inland up the Balsas River basin to southern Morelos. It inhabits tropical dry forest at elevations from sea level to 1,800 m (5,910 ft).

== Behavior ==
=== Movement ===
The golden-crowned emerald is mostly resident but is thought to make some seasonal elevational movements in a few areas.

=== Feeding ===
The golden-crowned emerald is a "trap-line" feeder, visiting a circuit of flowering plants to take nectar. They wag their tail and spread its fork as they feed. In addition to nectar, they take insects from foliage.

=== Breeding ===
The golden-crowned emerald's breeding season appears to span from February to July. It builds a small cup nest near the tip of a thin branch near the ground. Four nests in Jalisco had a small platform of wood pieces under the cup. The cup was made of kapok seed fibers with grass, bits of wood, and lichens on the outside. The clutch size is two eggs and fledging occurs about 24 or 25 days after hatch.

=== Vocalization ===
The golden-crowned emerald has "dry, rattling and chattering calls".

== Status ==
The IUCN has assessed the golden-crowned emerald as being of Least Concern. It has large range and an estimated population of at least 50,000 mature individuals that is believed to be decreasing. "Human activity probably has little short term effect on Golden-crowned Emerald."
