= Guadalupe Canyon =

Geographic feature in Arizona, New Mexico, and Sonora

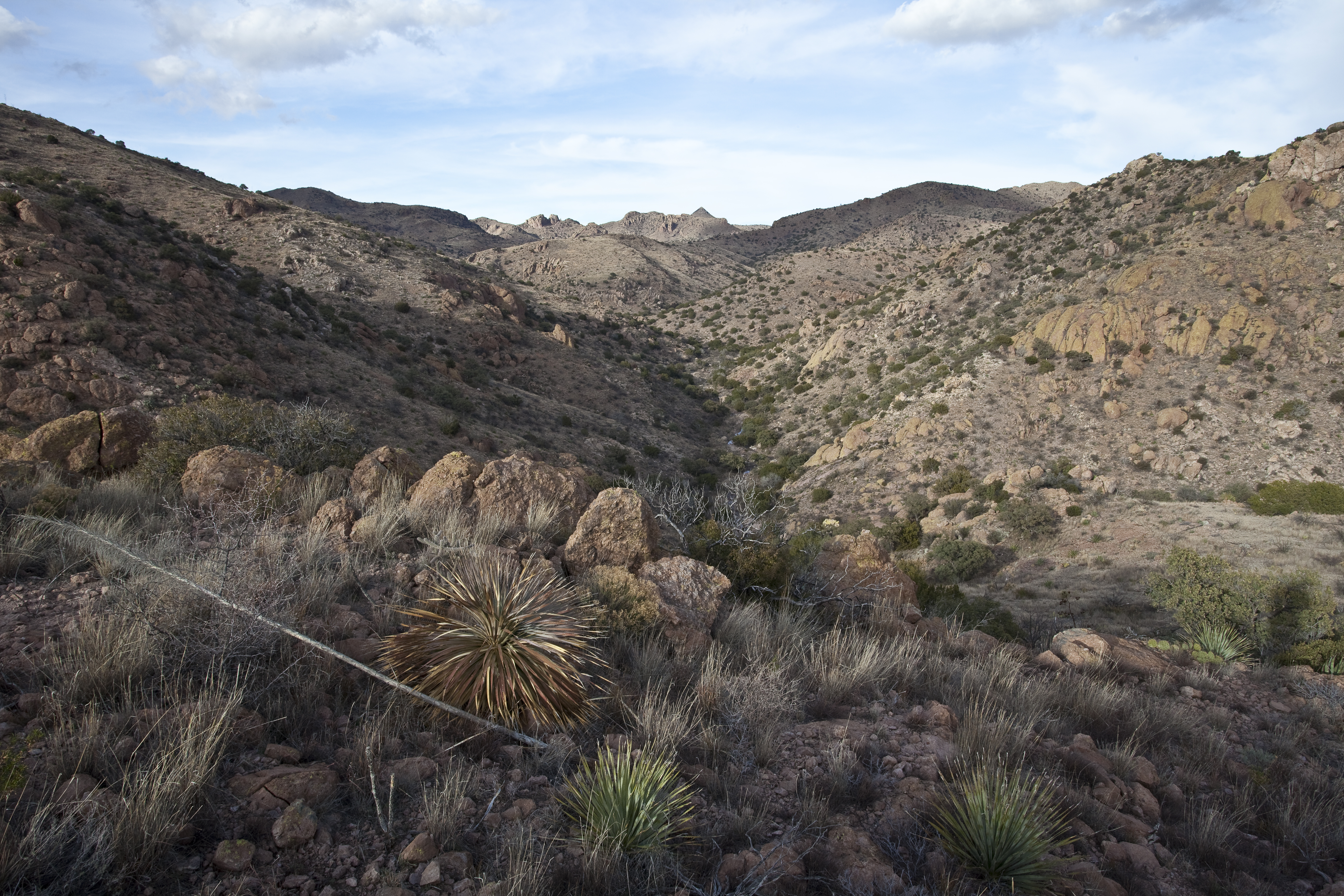
Guadalupe Canyon

Guadalupe Canyon is a canyon and valley in the southern portion of the Peloncillo Mountains Hidalgo County, New Mexico, Cochise County, Arizona and Agua Prieta Municipality, of Sonora. The waters of Guadalupe Canyon are tributary to the San Bernardino River joining it at its mouth at 31°13′33″N 109°16′10″W just below Dieciocho de Augusto, Sonora. Its source is at 31°28′08″N 109°02′21″W at an elevation of 6,160 feet on the south slope of Guadalupe Mountain (6,444 feet). It crosses the border into Mexico at 31°19′57″N 109°05′19″W at an elevation of 4,173 feet / 1,272 meters.

In November 1846, the Mormon Battalion marched through Guadalupe Canyon. In 1881 the Guadalupe Canyon Massacre took place.

== Habitat ==
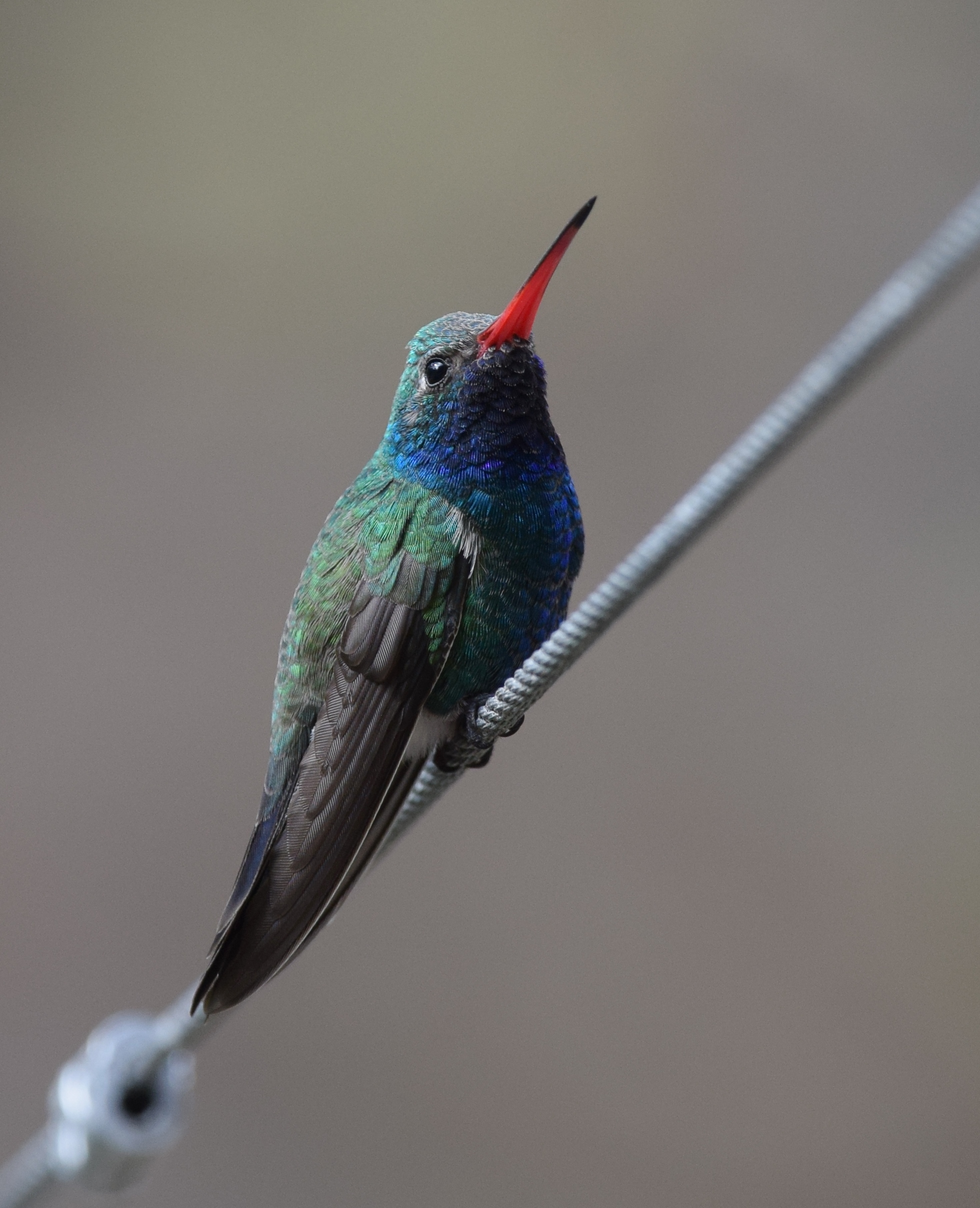
Adult male Broad-billed Hummingbird

The canyon is a wildlife corridor and provides habitat for violet-crowned hummingbirds and aplomado falcons. Other birds in the area are the broad-billed hummingbird, northern beardless tyrannulet, summer tanager, thick-billed kingbird, Elf Owl, black-tailed gnatcatcher, varied bunting, and wild turkey. The black-chinned hummingbird, and Costa's hummingbird also nest in the canyon.

Guadalupe canyon is also a wildlife corridor for Mexican gray wolves, and endangered jaguars, whose range bridges between the borders of both countries. Black bears, mountain lions, ocelots, and white-nosed coati also use the canyon as a corridor and hunting ground. The canyon area is a federally designated critical habitat for endangered wild feline.

Trees in the riparian habitat areas within the canyon include oak, Arizona sycamore, willow, and Freemont Cottonwood.

== Border barrier ==
In 2020, portions of the canyon's sides were dynamited to make way for construction of the Mexico–United States border wall, prompting heavy criticism. The 30-foot (9.1 m) tall barrier is constructed from metal bollard strips with 4-inch-wide openings. The gap is not large enough for mammals and certain reptiles, such as desert tortoises to pass through.
