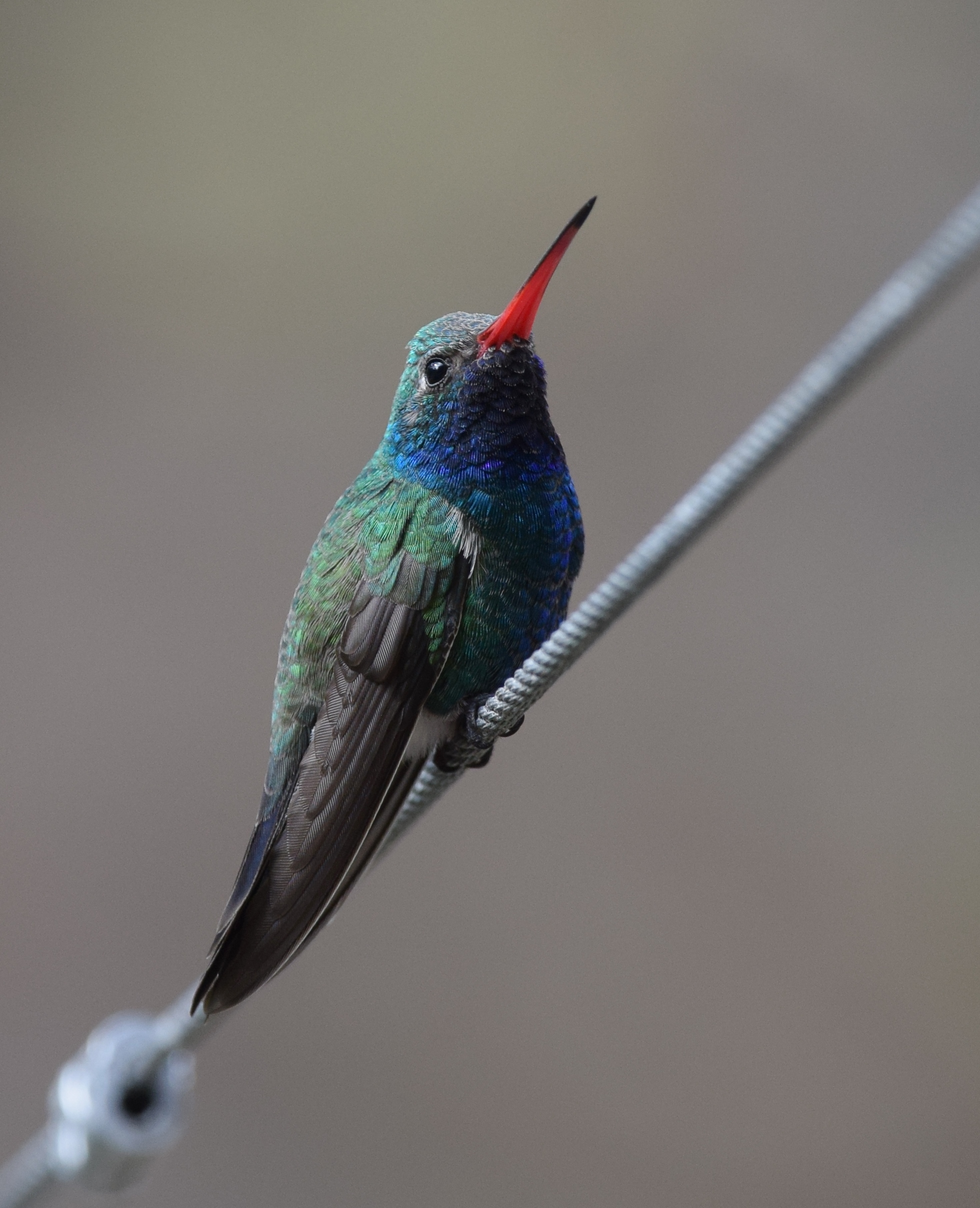
- Adult male
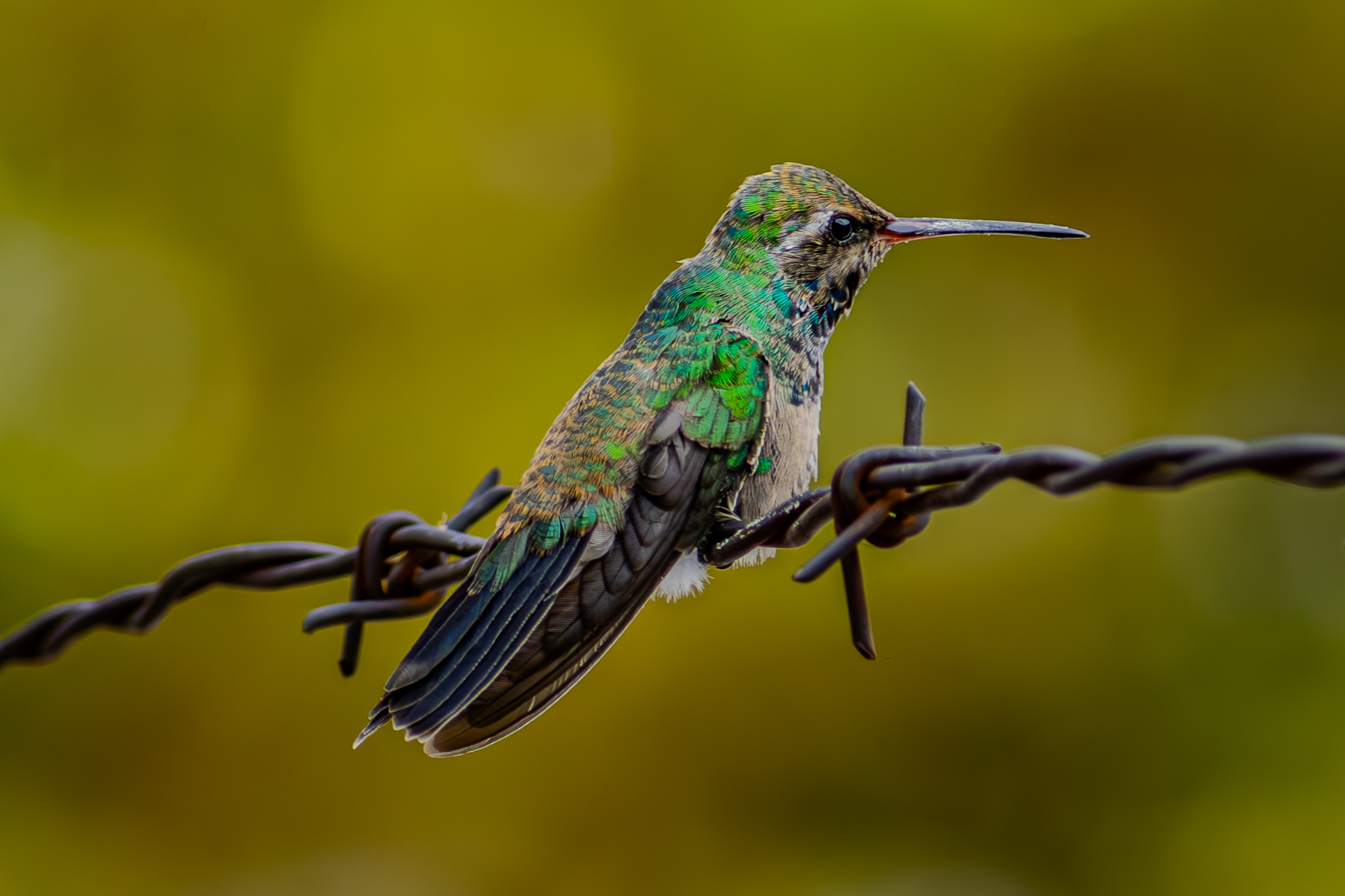
- Adult female

Conservation status
- Least Concern (IUCN 3.1)
- CITES Appendix II

Scientific classification
- Kingdom: Animalia
- Phylum: Chordata
- Class: Aves
- Order: Apodiformes
- Family: Trochilidae
- Genus: Cynanthus
- Species: C. latirostris

Binomial name
- Cynanthus latirostris William Swainson, 1827
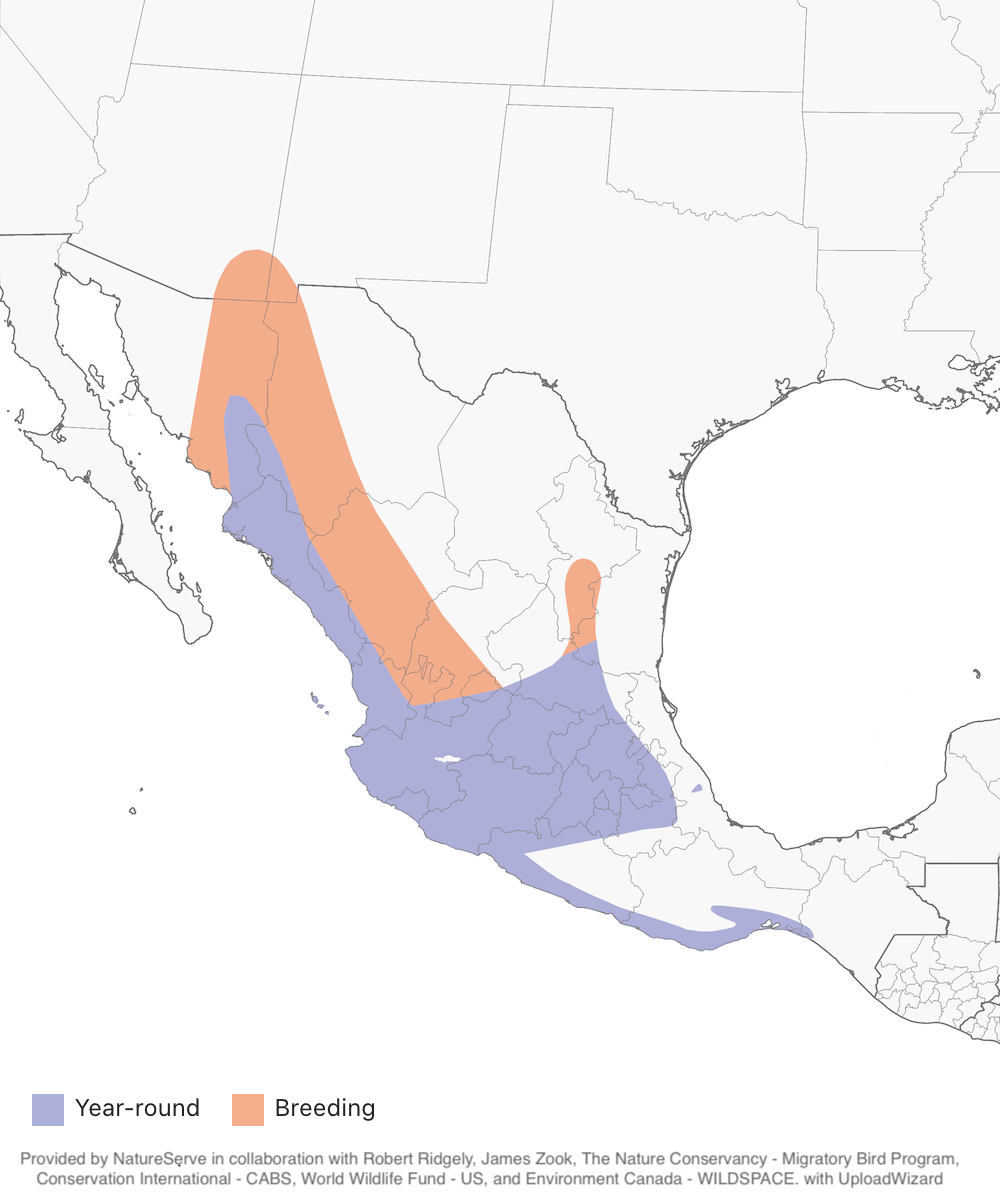

= Broad-billed hummingbird =

North-American hummingbird

The broad-billed hummingbird (Cynanthus latirostris) is a small hummingbird that resides in Mexico and the southwestern United States. Males and females have different features (see sexual dimorphism). The juveniles resemble the female adult more than the male adult. The broad-billed hummingbird is a bright green bird. The broad, red bill in both sexes and the male's blue gorget are useful for identification. The bird is also known for its other common names – the Colibrí Pico Ancho in Spanish and Colibri circé in French. It is more active during the day and less active during the night (see diurnality).

== Taxonomy ==
There are around 360 described species of hummingbirds that can be further categorized into nine different clades. The Cynanthus genus falls under the emerald clade of hummingbirds. The emerald clade formed between 10 and 15 million years ago and has the largest diversity of species. The broad-billed hummingbird was formally described in 1827 by William Swainson based on specimens collected by William Bullock in México. Swainson coined the binomial name Cynanthus latirostris. Swainson specified the type locality as "Table land ?" where he included a question mark. This species probably does not occur there and in 1939 the American ornithologist Robert Moore designated the type locality as the Valley of Mexico near Mexico City. The species name combines the Latin latus meaning "broad" with -rostris meaning "-billed".

=== Subspecies ===
The North American Classification Committee of the American Ornithological Society (AOS), the International Ornithological Committee (IOC), and BirdLife International's Handbook of the Birds of the World (HBW) recognize these three subspecies of broad-billed hummingbird:

- C. l. magicus (Mulsant and Verreaux, J, 1872) – southwest USA, Sonora, Sinaloa and Nayarit (northwest Mexico)
- C. l. propinquus Moore, RT 1939 – Guanajuato and north Michoacán (central Mexico)
- C. l. latirostris Swainson, 1827 – Tamaulipas, San Luis Potosí to Veracruz (east Mexico)

These three taxonomic systems previously included two more subspecies, what are now the Tres Marias hummingbird (C. lawrencei) and the turquoise-crowned hummingbird (C. doubledayi) but by mid-2022 had recognized them as separate species based on 2014 and 2017 publications. As of that date the most recent Clements taxonomy was dated August 2021. That taxonomy recognized the turquoise-crowned hummingbird but retained the Tres Marias as a subspecies of broad-billed.

The broad-billed hummingbird has hybridized with two different species: Rivoli's hummingbird (Eugenes fulgens) and the Violet-crowned hummingbird (Amazilia violiceps).

== Description ==
The broad-billed hummingbird is a small hummingbird about 8–10 cm (3.1–3.9 in) long. It weighs only 3–4 grams, with the male weighing slightly more than the female. The wingspan of this hummingbird is about 13 cm (5.1 in). It has a long, bright reddish coloured bill that has a black tip. The birds are metallic green dorsally with dull colouring on the crown and forehead. The hummingbird is sexually dimorphic, with male and female adults appearing significantly different.

The male is dark green with white undertail-coverts and a blue throat or gorget. The adult male's tail is blackish-blue and broad. The flight feathers are brownish-gray. The adult female has a pale belly and has a white eyestripe behind her eye. Her tail feathers are white-tipped. The bill of the male is shorter but brighter red. As for size, both the juvenile and adult males have larger wings and tails than the female.

The colouring of the juveniles tends to resemble the adult female. With time, the bill of the juvenile males will redden, and iridescent feathers will appear on its throat. Unlike the females, the juvenile males do not have a white-tipped tail.

The hatchings have a brown body and orange downy feathers and an orange bill. Not much is known about hatchlings, but in captivity, the juvenile birds have been seen to have adult plumage within 6–8 months.

=== Vocalizations ===
The C. latirostris chatter is done by both the male and the female. Like the note of a Ruby-crowned Kinglet (Regulus calendula), the chatter sounds like a rapid chi-dit. This noise can be done while perching or in flight. The males display call is a whining zing - but little is known about its song.

== Distribution and habitat ==
In the United States, C. l. latirostris lives along streamsides and oak woodlands. It prefers areas with streamside groves and dense vegetation, as well as open oak woodlands in lower canyons. It favours living in areas with Arizona sycamore (Platanus wrightii), Fremont cottonwoods (Populus fremontii), and mesquite.

In Mexico, specimens have been collected at nearly every elevation above sea level, even from 1494 to 3048 meters high. Along the Pacific coast, the broad-billed hummingbird is known to be a common resident of arid thorn forests, tropical deciduous forests and riparian gallery forests.

During breeding season, the broad-billed hummingbird is common in desert canyons and low mountain oak woodlands. It's found in the Southwest United States through to central Mexico. It has been noted breeding in southeast Arizona, southwest New Mexico, and rarely in southwest Texas. There have also been rare sightings across the continent, including in Arkansas. In the state of Sonora, Mexico, it is the most common hummingbird.

=== Migration and permanent residents ===
The breeding populations of C. l. latirostris in the United States, Sonora and Nuevo León are all migratory. Not enough information is known about the migration but it's believed that the birds fly deeper south into Mexico, into Guerrero and Baja California Sur. Most populations in Mexico are resident, unless they reside in the extreme north. The Northern populations migrate south in the beginning of November, and return in early March. There have been rare sightings in the fall and winter months in Southern California, Texas, and even rarely in Oregon, Idaho, Colorado and the East Coast. An abundance map of broad-bill hummingbirds has been produced on eBird.

== Behaviour ==
=== Diet ===
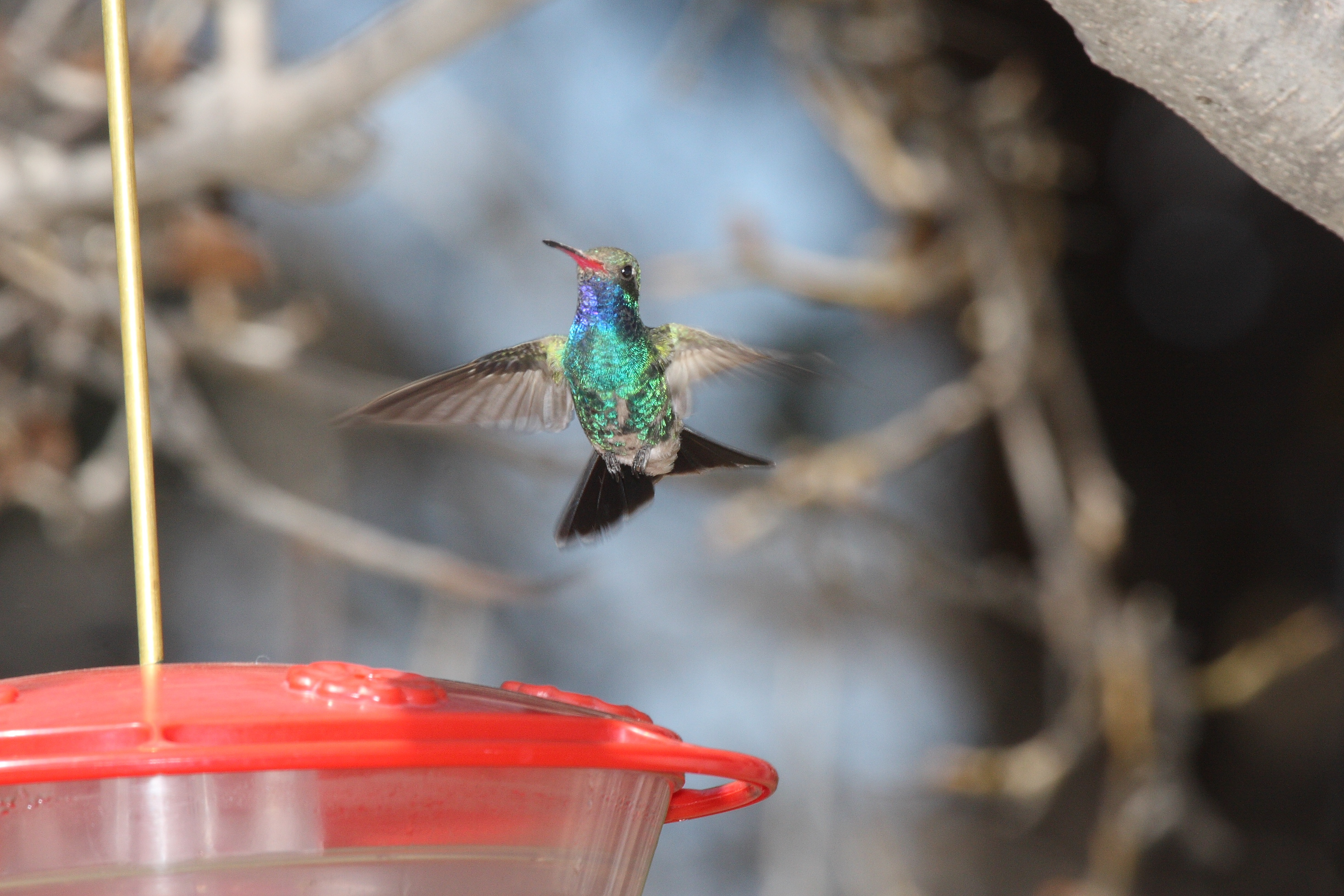
C. latirostris visiting a sugar-water feeder

The broad-billed hummingbird eats both nectar and insects. The hummingbird is also known to visit sugar-water hummingbird feeders. Their eating habits showed that the broad-billed hummingbird prefers visiting red or red-and-yellow flowers the most.

To feed on nectar, the hummingbird will extend its bill and long tongue into the flower to access the nectar while hovering. This differs from their behaviour at feeders, where oftentimes they will perch. To feed on insects, the bird species catch them midair or hover and pluck them from a plant.

Not much is known on the metabolism, drinking, and food selection process of this species.

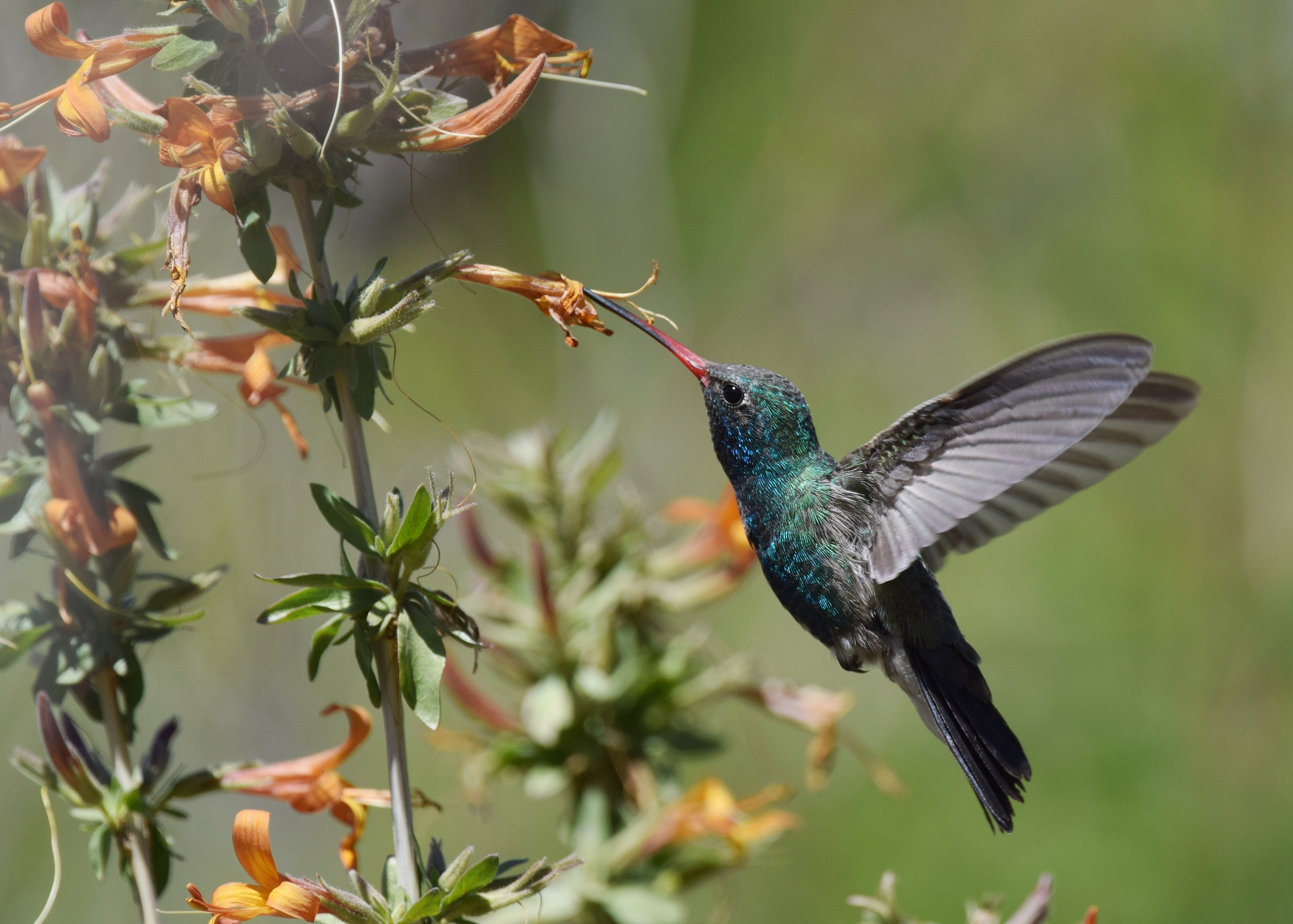
C. latirostris feeding on nectar from a flower in Arizona

In the United States, the Broad-billed hummingbird is known to eat from the following flowering species:

Agave (Agave parryi and A. schottii), desert honeysuckle (Anisacanthus thurberi), milkweed (Asclepias spp.), Bouvardia (Bouvardia glaberima), bird-of-paradise (Caesalpinia gilliesii), Indian paintbrush (Castilleja spp.), desert willow (Chilopsis linearis), New Mexico thistle (Cirsium neomexicanum), fireweed (Epilobium canum), coral bean (Erythrina flabelliformis), ocotillo (Fouquieria splendens), trumpet honeysuckle (Lonicera sempervirens), scarlet bugler (Penstemon barbatus), Mojave beardtongue (P. pseudospectabilis), superb penstemon (P. superbus) and Texas betony (Stachys coccinea).

In southern Mexico, the Broad-billed hummingbird is known to eat from the following flower species:

Bejuco blanco (Exogonium bracteatum), pochote (Ceiba aesculifolia), cactus (Lemairocereus spp.), fairy-duster (Calliandra spp.), Bumelia spp. and liana (Paullinia sessiliflora).

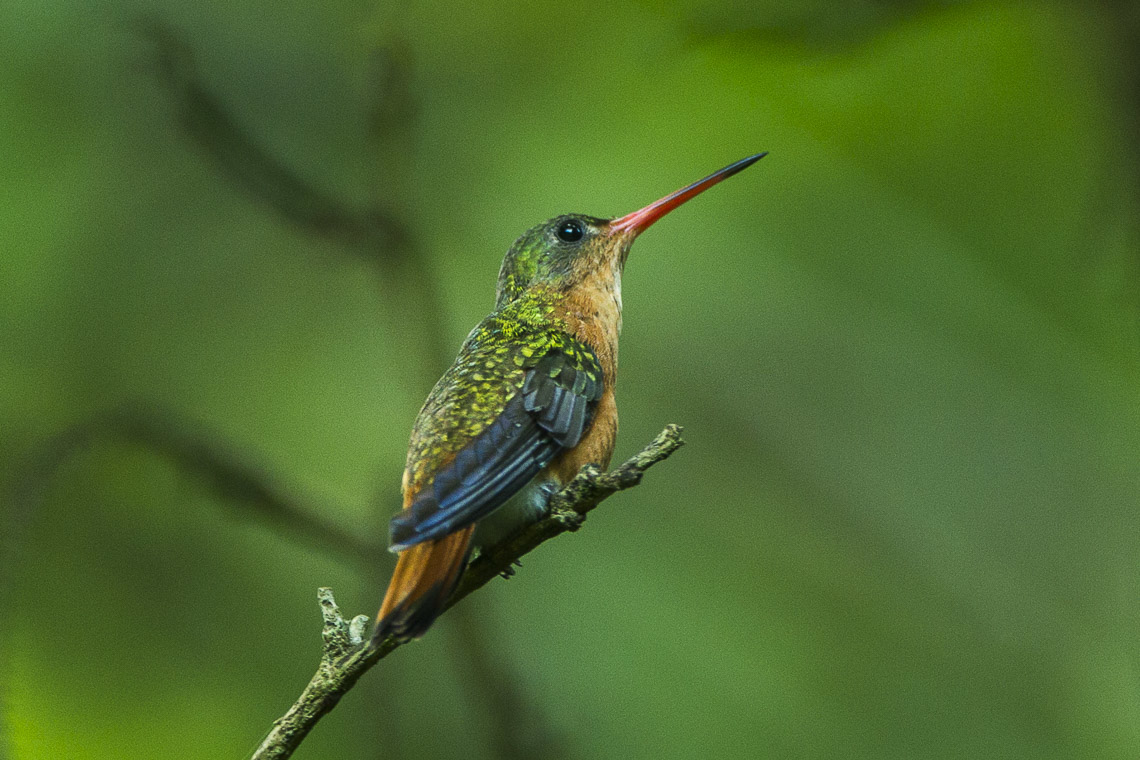
The cinnamon hummingbird (above) competes with the broad-billed hummingbird, making C. latirostris forage from lower quality food sources.

In Nayarit and Jalisco, Mexico, the broad-billed hummingbird is known to occur in the same range as the Cinnamon hummingbird (Amazilia rutila). This leads to food competition and therefore when co-occurring, the C. latirostris will feed from flowers with low-nectar availability. The broad-billed hummingbird will feed from high-nectar available flowers such as the sharpleaf jacaranda (Jacaranda acutifolia), sleeping hibiscus (Malvaviscus arboreus), and mistletoe (Psittacanthus longipennis). When in competition with the A. rutila, the C. latirostris will feed from Calopogonium parvum, royal poinciana (Delonix regia), velvet-seed (Hamelia versicolor), hibiscus (Hibiscus sp.), and coralblow (Russelia tenuis).

In central Mexico, the C. latirostris feeds on two cacti (Pachycereus weberi and Pilosocereus chrysacanthus.) After feeding on these species, the hummingbirds studied were found to have pollen grains on them. However it was deemed that they have no role in the pollination of these plants.

There is little available information regarding the broad-billed hummingbird eating insects. However, one study showed that even when there is an abundance of insects, the hummingbirds prefer to feed from flowers if available. In Guadalupe Canyon, Mexico, the hummingbirds were only seen eating flying Diptera and Ephemeroptera.

=== Breeding ===
Broad-billed hummingbirds reproduce sexually through mates choice. To attract a mate, the male will perform a "pendulum display" to the female. This display consists of the male bird hovering in front of the female and flying back and forth at least four times in repeated arcs, just like a pendulum.

In the United States, there are usually two brood attempts per year: in mid-April to mid-to-late June, and in July to mid-August. These dates overlap with the peak nectar availability in the broad-bill hummingbirds' habitats. In Arizona, pairs breed in semi-open habitats at 914 to 1524 meters in elevation. In southern Mexico, the species breeds over a long period of time. The bird's sex organs have been shown to be able to breed from January to August. In Sonora and western Mexico, breeding starts mid-January, peaking in Mid March and ending in August.

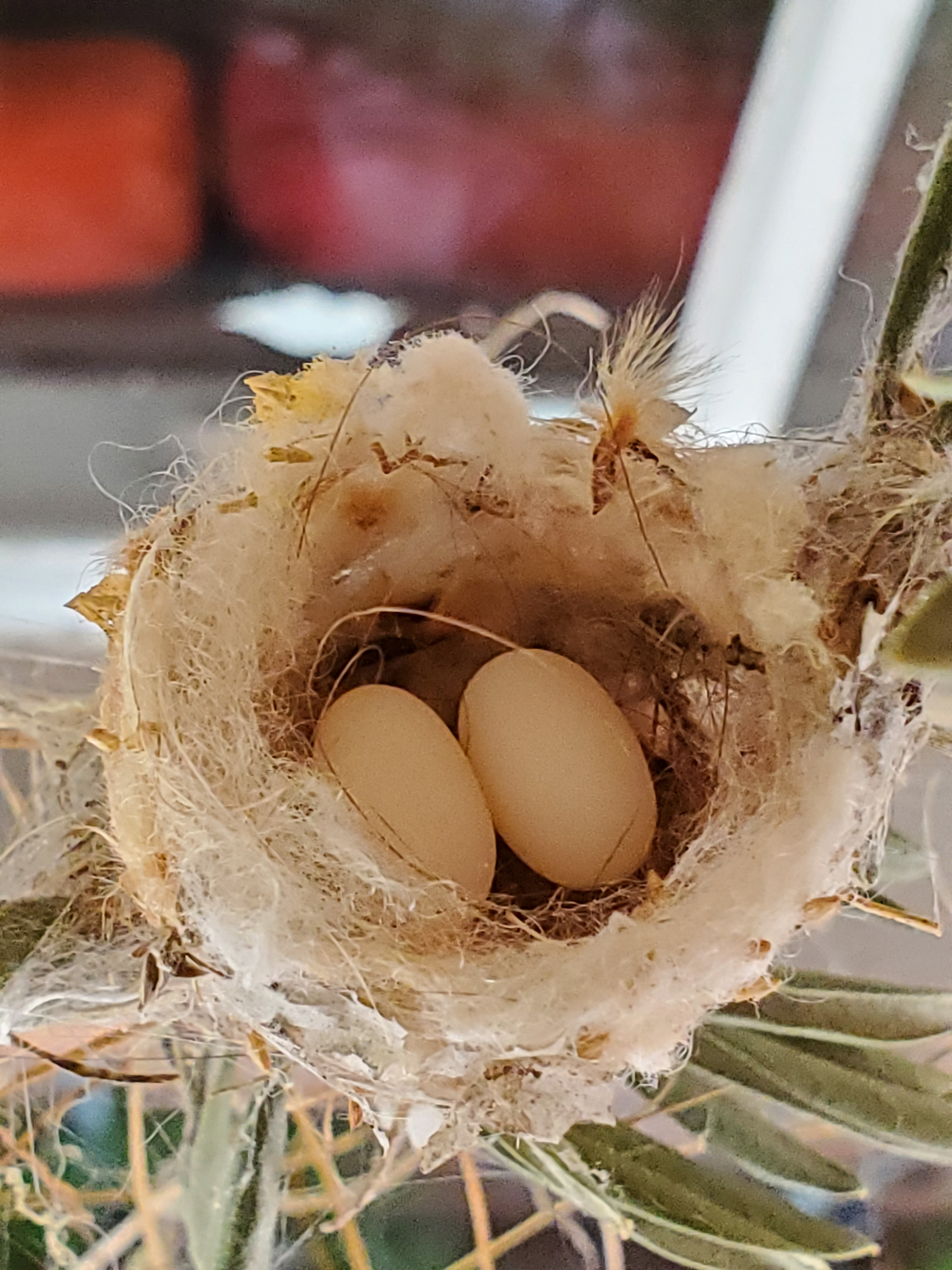
Two eggs in a broad-billed hummingbird nest (Tucson, AZ; April, 2023)

The broad-billed hummingbird typically creates a nest within two meters of the ground. In Guadalupe Canyon, most nests were found to be at an average height of 1.1 meter above the ground. Although the height from the ground matters to the mothers, nesting habitats have been found at many elevations. One study found four nests between 14 meters, in Sinaloa, to 442 meters, in Sonora. Nest site selection is thought to be less specific in individuals living towards the southern part of the range. The nests themselves are constructed only by the females. The female will weave nesting material (spider web, seeds, grasses, and dried leaves and flowers) into a nest and shape it with her body, kicking the sides to compact the materials. The nest is about 2.5 cm tall, with an interior diameter of 1.9 cm. The interior is lined with materials such as white plant down, plant stems, leaves, plant blooms, and even lichen. Once ready, the female broad-billed hummingbird will lay two eggs in her nest. The eggs of C. latirostris are smooth and white. On average, the eggs measure 12 by 8 millimeters. Although uncertain, it's believed that the female incubates the eggs for more than 2 weeks. After hatching, the females in Guadalupe Canyon spent about 60% of each hour at their nests. The largest causes of nest mortality are due to abandonment of nests before eggs are laid, failure for eggs to hatch, and predation on eggs and nestlings.

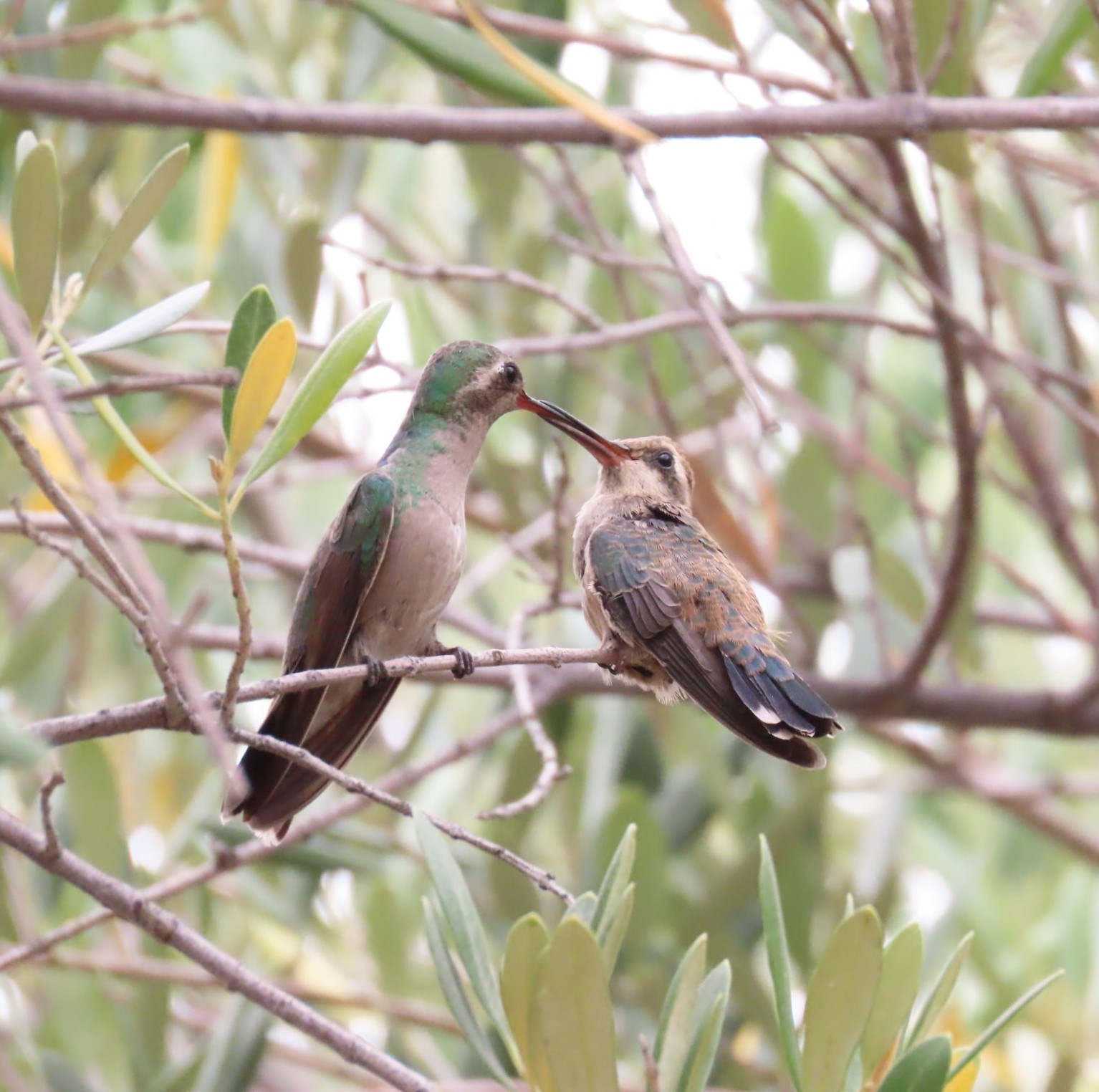
Mother broad-billed hummingbird feeding fledgling one day out of the nest; Tucson, AZ; April, 2026

Little is known about incubation, hatching, growth, and fledging of broad-billed hummingbirds.
