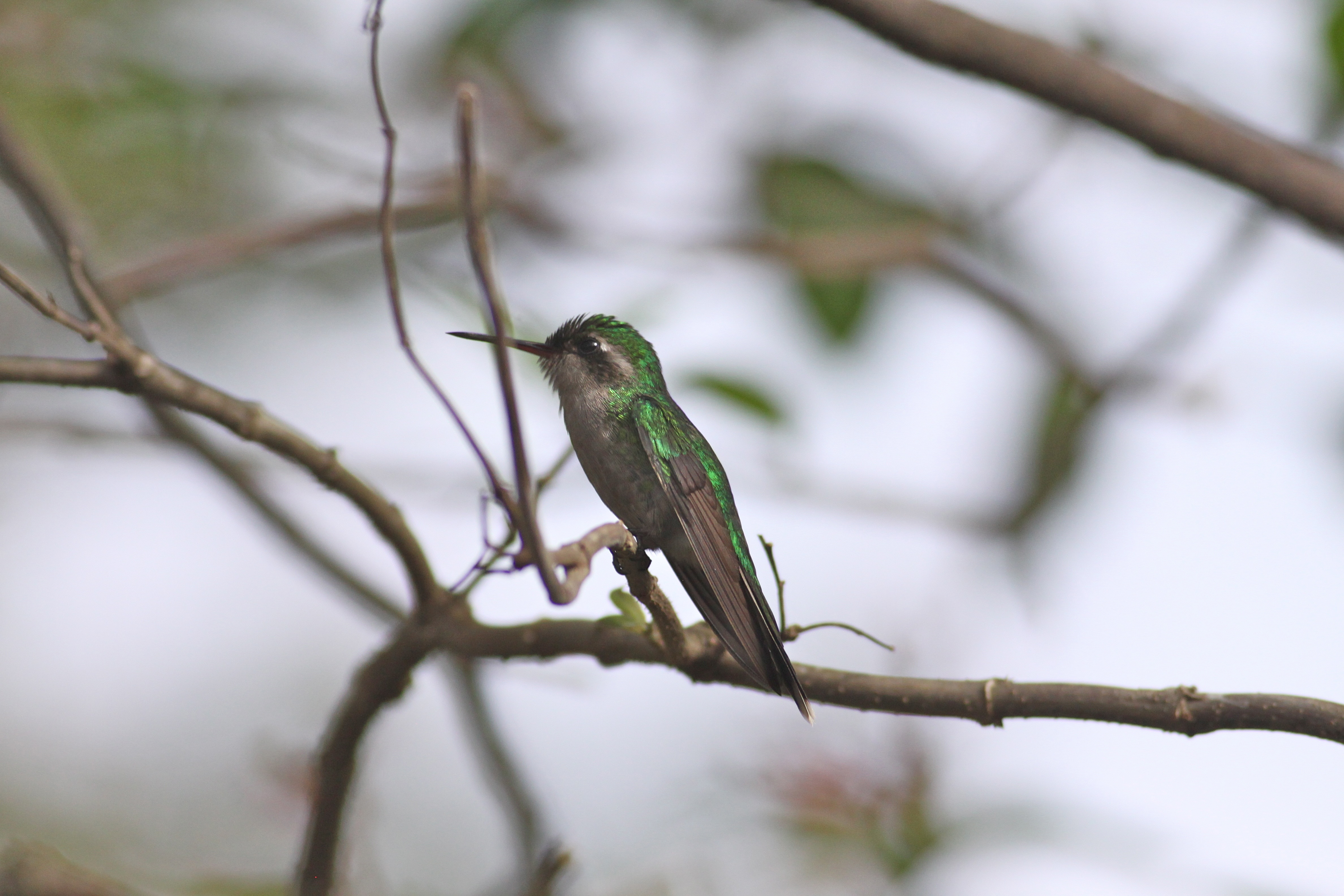

Conservation status
- Least Concern (IUCN 3.1)
- CITES Appendix II

Scientific classification
- Kingdom: Animalia
- Phylum: Chordata
- Class: Aves
- Order: Apodiformes
- Family: Trochilidae
- Genus: Cynanthus
- Species: C. forficatus

Binomial name
- Cynanthus forficatus (Ridgway, 1885)
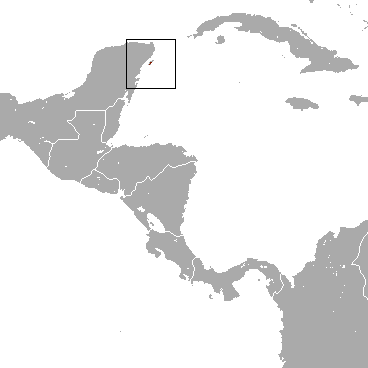
- Cozumel emerald range

Synonyms
- Chlorostilbon forficatus

= Cozumel emerald =

Species of hummingbird

The Cozumel emerald (Cynanthus forficatus) is a species of hummingbird in the "emeralds", tribe Trochilini of subfamily Trochilinae. It is endemic to the Mexican island of Cozumel off the Yucatán Peninsula.

== Taxonomy and systematics ==
The Cozumel emerald's taxonomic history is complicated. It was originally described as Chlorostilbon forficatus, then as a subspecies of golden-crowned emerald (now Cynanthus auriceps) which itself has been treated as a subspecies of Canivet's emerald (now Cynanthus canivetii). Other more recent authors include it and many other taxa as subspecies of the blue-tailed emerald (Chlorostilbon mellisugus).

The North American Classification Committee of the American Ornithological Society, the International Ornithological Committee (IOC), and the Clements taxonomy assign it the binomial Cynanthus forficatus. However, as of 2020 BirdLife International's Handbook of the Birds of the World (HBW) retains it in genus Chlorostilbon.

== Description ==
Male Cozumel emeralds are 9 to 10.5 cm (3.5 to 4.1 in) long and females 8 to 9.1 cm (3.1 to 3.6 in). Males and females both weigh about 2.5 g (0.088 oz). Males have a black bill with a red tip. Its crown is bright golden to golden green and the rest of the upperparts are a slightly duller golden green. Its underparts are brilliant metallic golden green with white tibial tufts. The tail is long and deeply forked, blue-black or black with a blue gloss, and the central two or three pairs of feathers have dark brownish gray tips. The female's maxilla is black and the mandible red with a black tip. Its upperparts are bright metallic green to bronze green. It has a white stripe behind the eye and blackish cheeks. Its underparts are light gray. Its tail is not as long or deeply forked as the male's. The central pair of feathers are metallic green to blue green and the next two pairs are the same color with a blue-black or black band near the end and white tips. The outermost two pairs have white outer webs at their base, a wide black band near the end, and white tips.

== Distribution and habitat ==
The Cozumel emerald is found essentially only on Cozumel Island of the coast of Mexico's Yucatán Peninsula. There is a specimen from Isla Mujeres about 90 km (56 mi) north of Cozumel, and the species is thought to occasionally visit there. There is another record at Playa de Hotel Riu Palace Riviera Maya in 2026. Authors have described its habitat as "scrub and low deciduous insular forest" and "brushy woodland and scrub, second growth".

== Behavior ==
=== Movement ===
The Cozumel emerald is a year-round resident of the island.

=== Feeding ===
The Cozumel emerald's feeding strategy and diet have not been detailed. They are assumed to be similar to those of Canivet's emerald, which forages by trap-lining, visiting a circuit of a variety of flowering plants, and also feeds on small arthropods.

=== Breeding ===
The Cozumel emerald's breeding season, nest, and other details of its breeding phenology have not been described.

=== Vocalization ===
The Cozumel emerald's vocalizations are described as similar to those of it close relatives, "dry, rattling and chattering calls".

== Status ==
The IUCN has assessed the Cozumel emerald as being of Least Concern. It has an estimated population between 20,000 and 50,000 mature individuals that is believed to be stable. No immediate threats have been identified. It is described as fairly common to common and "[h]uman activity probably has little short term effect on [the] Cozumel Emerald, which occupies edge and disturbed habitats."
