= Mojave beardtongue =

Mojave beardtongue or Mojave penstemon is a common name for multiple plants and may refer to:

- Penstemon incertus, with blue to purple flowers
- Penstemon pseudospectabilis, with red to pink flowers
