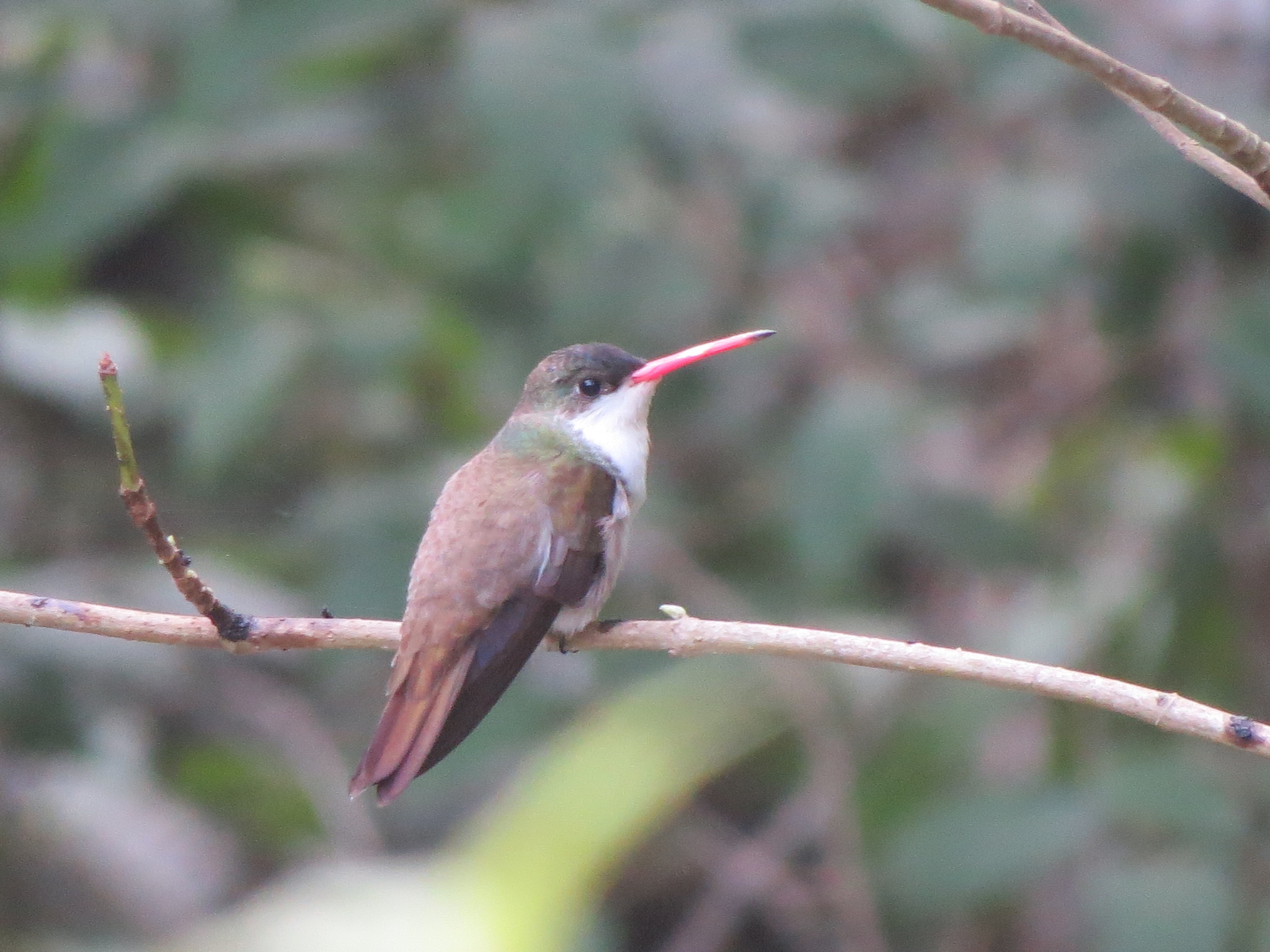

Conservation status
- Least Concern (IUCN 3.1)
- CITES Appendix II

Scientific classification
- Kingdom: Animalia
- Phylum: Chordata
- Class: Aves
- Order: Apodiformes
- Family: Trochilidae
- Genus: Ramosomyia
- Species: R. viridifrons

Binomial name
- Ramosomyia viridifrons (Elliot, 1871)
- Distribution

Synonyms
- Amazilia viridifrons, Leucolia viridifrons

= Green-fronted hummingbird =

Species of birds

The green-fronted hummingbird (Ramosomyia viridifrons) is a species of hummingbird in the "emeralds", tribe Trochilini of subfamily Trochilinae. It is found in Mexico and possibly Guatemala.

== Taxonomy and systematics ==
The green-fronted hummingbird was formerly placed in the genus Amazilia. A molecular phylogenetic study published in 2014 found that Amazilia was polyphyletic. In the revised classification to create monophyletic genera, the green-fronted hummingbird was one of three species moved to the resurrected genus Leucolia by some taxonomic systems. However, a study published in 2021 showed that Leucolia was not available because of the principle of priority. The authors proposed the new genus Ramosomyia and in mid-2022 it was adopted by the North American Classification Committee of the American Ornithological Society (AOS) and the International Ornithological Committee (IOC). As of that date the Clements taxonomy retains the species in Leucolia and BirdLife International's Handbook of the Birds of the World (HBW) in the earlier Amazilia.

The IOC and HBW assign two subspecies to the green-fronted hummingbird, the nominate R. v. viridifrons and R. v. villadai. AOS and Clements include a third, R. v. wagneri, that the IOC and HBW consider to be a separate species, the cinnamon-sided hummingbird. This article follows the IOC/HBW model.

In the mid-1900s two authors suggested that the green-fronted hummingbird is conspecific with the violet-crowned hummingbird (Ramosomyia violiceps) but most taxonomists have not accepted that treatment.

== Description ==
The green-fronted hummingbird is 10 to 11.5 cm (3.9 to 4.5 in) long and weighs about 6.3 g (0.22 oz). Both sexes of both subspecies have a red bill with a black tip. Adult males of the nominate subspecies have a glittering bluish green crown, an emerald to bronze green nape and back, and grayish brown to bronze rump and uppertail coverts. Their tail is coppery to purplish with bronze green edges to the feathers. Their underside from throat to undertail coverts is pure white with emerald to bronze green sides and bronze green flanks. Adult females are similar, though with a dark green crown and a bronze green to golden green tail. Males and females of subspecies R. v. villadai are very similar to the nominate but somewhat larger, and the green of their sides is less extensive giving a white appearance to their underparts.

== Distribution and habitat ==
The nominate subspecies of green-fronted hummingbird is found in southern Mexico from central Guerrero into western Oaxaca. R. v. villadai is found from Oaxaca into most of Chiapas according to the IOC, Clements, and the AOS. BirdLife International extends the range of villadai into western Guatemala. The species inhabits deciduous forest, thorn forest, arid to semi-arid scrublands, gallery forest, and somewhat open landscapes with trees. In elevation it ranges between 60 and 1,400 m (200 and 4,600 ft).

== Behavior ==
=== Movement ===
The green-fronted hummingbird is generally a year-round resident, but individuals do make some seasonal movements.

=== Feeding ===
The green-fronted hummingbird forages for nectar at all heights of its habitat but is most common from the mid-level up to the canopy. The flowering plants that it feeds from have not been documented. It is assumed to also feed on small insects like most if not all other hummingbirds.

=== Breeding ===
The green-fronted hummingbird's nesting season has not been well defined but appears to include May, September, and October. Very few nests have been found; one was a cup made of whitish plant down covered with green lichens, and placed about 1.8 m (6 ft) above the ground. The clutch size is two. The incubation period and time to fledging are not known.

=== Vocalization ===
The green-fronted hummingbird's main vocalization is a soft "dry chattering".

== Status ==
The IUCN has assessed the green-fronted hummingbird as being of Least Concern, though its population size is unknown and believed to be decreasing. No specific threats have been identified. However, Mexican authorities consider it threatened by habitat loss.
