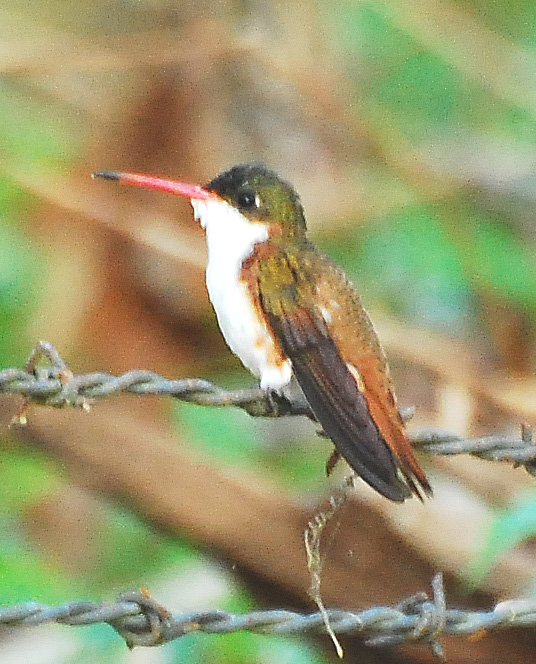

Conservation status
- Least Concern (IUCN 3.1)
- CITES Appendix II

Scientific classification
- Kingdom: Animalia
- Phylum: Chordata
- Class: Aves
- Clade: Strisores
- Order: Apodiformes
- Family: Trochilidae
- Genus: Ramosomyia
- Species: R. wagneri

Binomial name
- Ramosomyia wagneri (Phillips, AR, 1966)

Synonyms
- Amazilia wagneri; Leucolia viridifrons wagneri; Leucolia wagneri

= Cinnamon-sided hummingbird =

Species of bird

The cinnamon-sided hummingbird (Ramosomyia wagneri) is a species of hummingbird in the "emeralds", tribe Trochilini of subfamily Trochilinae. It is endemic to the Mexican state of Oaxaca.

== Taxonomy and systematics ==
The cinnamon-sided hummingbird was formerly placed in the genus Amazilia. A molecular phylogenetic study published in 2014 found that Amazilia was polyphyletic. In the revised classification to create monophyletic genera, the cinnamon-sided hummingbird was one of three species moved to the resurrected genus Leucolia by some taxonomic systems. However, a study published in 2021 showed that Leucolia was not available because of the principle of priority. The authors proposed the new genus Ramosomyia and in mid-2022 it was adopted by the North American Classification Committee of the American Ornithological Society (AOS) and the International Ornithological Committee (IOC). As of that date the Clements taxonomy retains the species in Leucolia and BirdLife International's Handbook of the Birds of the World (HBW) in the earlier Amazilia.

The IOC and HBW treat the cinnamon-sided hummingbird as a monotypic species. AOS and Clements treat it as a subspecies of the green-fronted hummingbird (Ramosomyia viridifrons wagneri and Leucolia viridifrons wagneri respectively). This article follows the IOC/HBW model.

== Description ==
The cinnamon-sided hummingbird is 10 to 11.5 cm (3.9 to 4.5 in) long and weighs about 6.3 g (0.22 oz). Both sexes have a red bill with a black tip. Adult males have a glittering bluish green crown, an emerald to bronze green nape and back, and grayish brown to bronze rump and uppertail coverts. Their tail is coppery to purplish with bronze green edges to the feathers. Their underside from throat to undertail coverts is pure white with the eponymous cinnamon sides and flanks. Adult females are similar, though with a dark green crown and a bronze green to golden green tail.

== Distribution and habitat ==
The cinnamon-sided hummingbird is found in a narrow strip of central and southern Oaxaca in southern Mexico. It inhabits deciduous forest, thorn forest, arid to semi-arid scrublands, gallery forest, and parks and gardens. In elevation it ranges between 250 and 900 m (820 and 3,000 ft).

== Behavior ==
=== Movement ===
The cinnamon-sided hummingbird is a year-round resident throughout its range.

=== Feeding ===
The cinnamon-sided hummingbird's foraging strategy and the flowering plants that it feeds from have not been documented. It is assumed to also feed on small insects like most if not all other hummingbirds.

=== Breeding ===
The Cornell Lab of Ornithology account includes the cinnamon-sided hummingbird within its account of the green-fronted hummingbird and has no information specific to the cinnamon-sided. Very little is known about the breeding phenology of the green-fronted sensu lato.

=== Vocalization ===
As is the case with breeding information, the cinnamon-sided hummingbird's vocalizations are not described separately from those of the green-fronted sensu lato.

== Status ==
The IUCN has assessed the cinnamon-sided hummingbird as being of Least Concern, though it has a very limited range and its population size is not known and believed to be decreasing.
