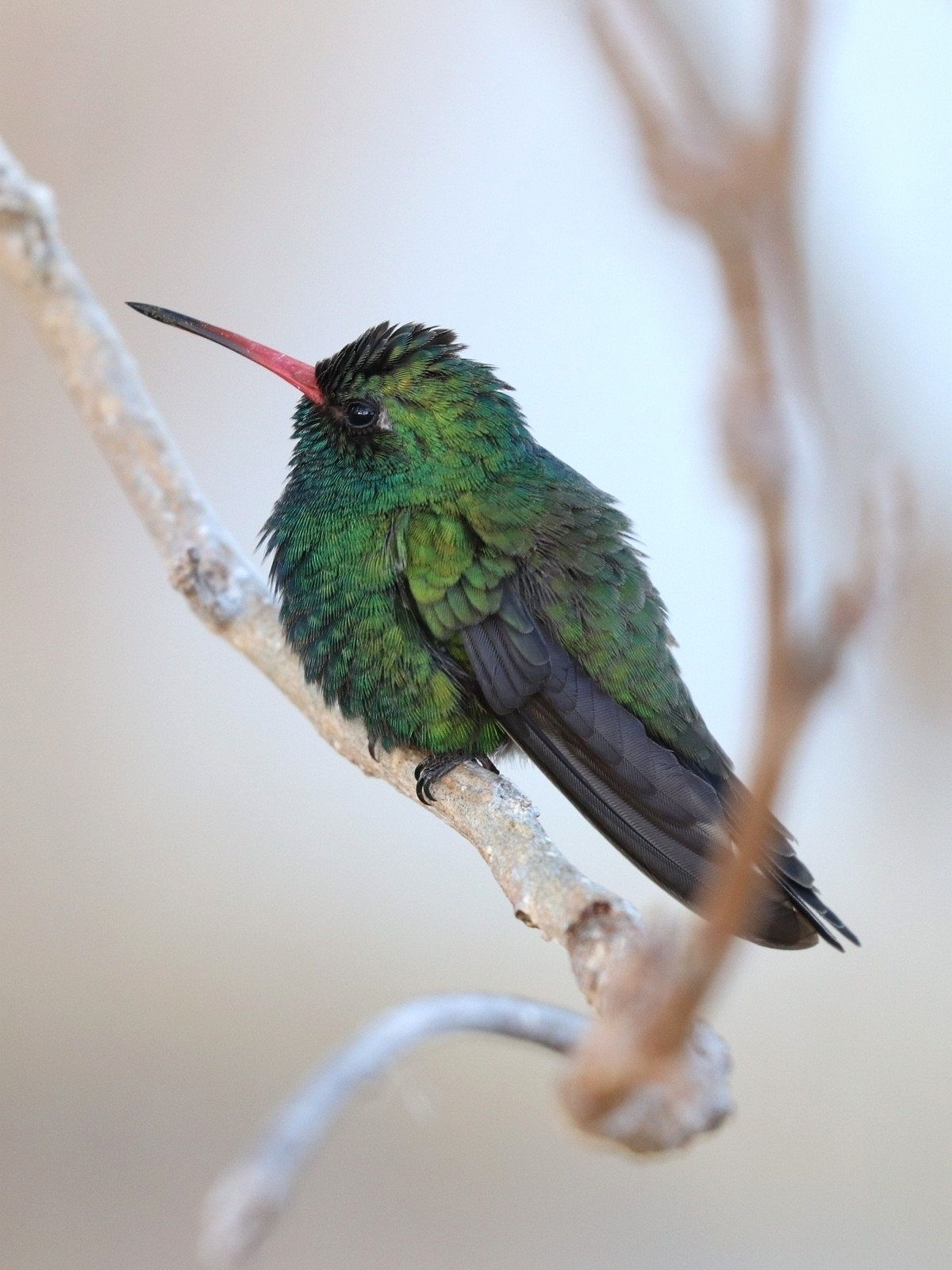

Conservation status
- Near Threatened (IUCN 3.1)

Scientific classification
- Kingdom: Animalia
- Phylum: Chordata
- Class: Aves
- Clade: Strisores
- Order: Apodiformes
- Family: Trochilidae
- Genus: Cynanthus
- Species: C. lawrencei

Binomial name
- Cynanthus lawrencei (Berlepsch, 1887)

= Tres Marias hummingbird =

The Tres Marías hummingbird (Cynanthus lawrencei) is a Near Threatened species of hummingbird in the "emeralds", tribe Trochilini of subfamily Trochilinae. It was formerly considered to be a subspecies of the broad-billed hummingbird. It is endemic to the Islas Marías island group off the west coast of Mexico.

== Taxonomy and systematics ==
The Tres Marias hummingbird was long treated as a subspecies of the broad-billed hummingbird. Based on 2014 and 2017 publications, by the end of 2022 the North American Classification Committee of the American Ornithological Society (AOS), the International Ornithological Committee (IOC), BirdLife International's Handbook of the Birds of the World (HBW), and the Clements taxonomy had recognized it as a species.

The Tres Marias hummingbird is monotypic.

== Description ==
The Tres Marias hummingbird has a broad reddish bill with a black tip. Both sexes have metallic bronze-green upperparts that is somewhat duller on the forehead and crown. Males have a turquoise-green to emerald green throat, a greeny-bronze breast, a dark green belly, and dark undertail coverts. The tail is glossy blue-black. Females' upperparts are duller than the male's and they have gray underparts. The base of their tail is bronze-green and the rest blue-black to greenish black with white tips on the outermost two pairs of feathers.

== Distribution ==
The Tres Marias hummingbird is found only on María Madre and María Cleofás of the Islas Marías, an island group off the coast of Nayarit, Mexico. Their specific habitat there has not been described.

== Behavior ==
=== Movement ===
The Tres Marias hummingbird is mostly sedentary but individuals have been collected in mainland Nayarit.

=== Feeding ===
The diet of the Tres Marias hummingbird has not separately described from that of the broad-billed hummingbird. In general, and like most hummingbirds, that species feeds on a wide variety of flowering plants and also small arthropods.

=== Breeding ===
No specifics of the Tres Marias hummingbird's breeding phenology have been published.

=== Vocalization ===
The Tres Marias hummingbird's vocalizations have not been separately described from those of the broad-billed hummingbird. That species' song, sung only by males, "[b]egins with short chip note, then a series of similar notes ranging in frequency from 2 to 13 kHz."

== Status ==
The IUCN has assessed the Tres Marias hummingbird as Near Threatened. It has a very small range and an estimated population of under 2500 mature individuals, though the population is believed to be stable. The potential threats include habitat destruction through urbanization, farming, and wood-cutting, and predation by invasive species.
