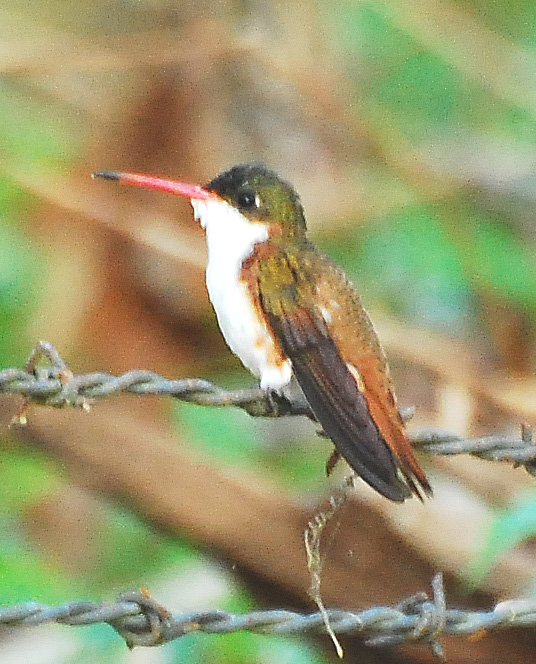
- Cinnamon-sided hummingbird, (Ramosomyia wagneri)

Scientific classification
- Kingdom: Animalia
- Phylum: Chordata
- Class: Aves
- Clade: Strisores
- Order: Apodiformes
- Family: Trochilidae
- Tribe: Trochilini
- Genus: Ramosomyia; M.D. Bruce & F.G. Stiles, 2021

Species
- 3, see text

Synonyms
- Leucolia

= Ramosomyia =

Genus of birds

Ramosomyia is a genus in family Trochilidae, the hummingbirds, that was created in 2021 to replace Leucolia.

== Taxonomy and species list ==
The genus contains three species:

Genus Ramosomyia – M.D. Bruce & F.G. Stiles, 2021 – three species
Common name	Scientific name and subspecies	Range	Size and ecology	IUCN status and estimated population
Violet-crowned hummingbird	Ramosomyia violiceps (Gould, 1859) Two subspecies: R. v. violiceps; R. v. ellioti	Mexico and the southwestern United States.	Size: Habitat: Diet:	LC
Green-fronted hummingbird	Ramosomyia viridifrons (Elliot, 1871)	Mexico and possibly Guatemala	Size: Habitat: Diet:	LC
Cinnamon-sided hummingbird	Ramosomyia wagneri (Phillips, AR, 1966)	Mexico	Size: Habitat: Diet:	LC

These species were early placed in the genus Amazilia. A molecular phylogenetic study published in 2014 found that the genus Amazilia was polyphyletic. In the revised classification to create monophyletic genera, these Mexican species were placed in the resurrected genus Leucolia by some taxonomic systems. However, a study published in 2021 showed that Leucolia was not available because of the principle of priority. The authors proposed the new genus Ramosomyia and in mid-2022 it was adopted by the North American Classification Committee of the American Ornithological Society and the International Ornithological Committee. As of that date the Clements taxonomy retains the three species in Leucolia and BirdLife International's Handbook of the Birds of the World in the earlier Amazilia.
