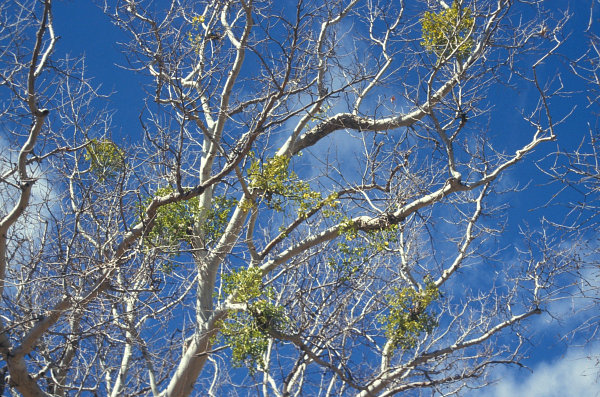
- On host Platanus wrightii

Scientific classification
- Kingdom: Plantae
- Clade: Tracheophytes
- Clade: Angiosperms
- Clade: Eudicots
- Order: Santalales
- Family: Santalaceae
- Genus: Phoradendron
- Species: P. macrophyllum

Binomial name
- Phoradendron macrophyllum (Engelm.) Cockerell

= Phoradendron macrophyllum =

Species of flowering plant

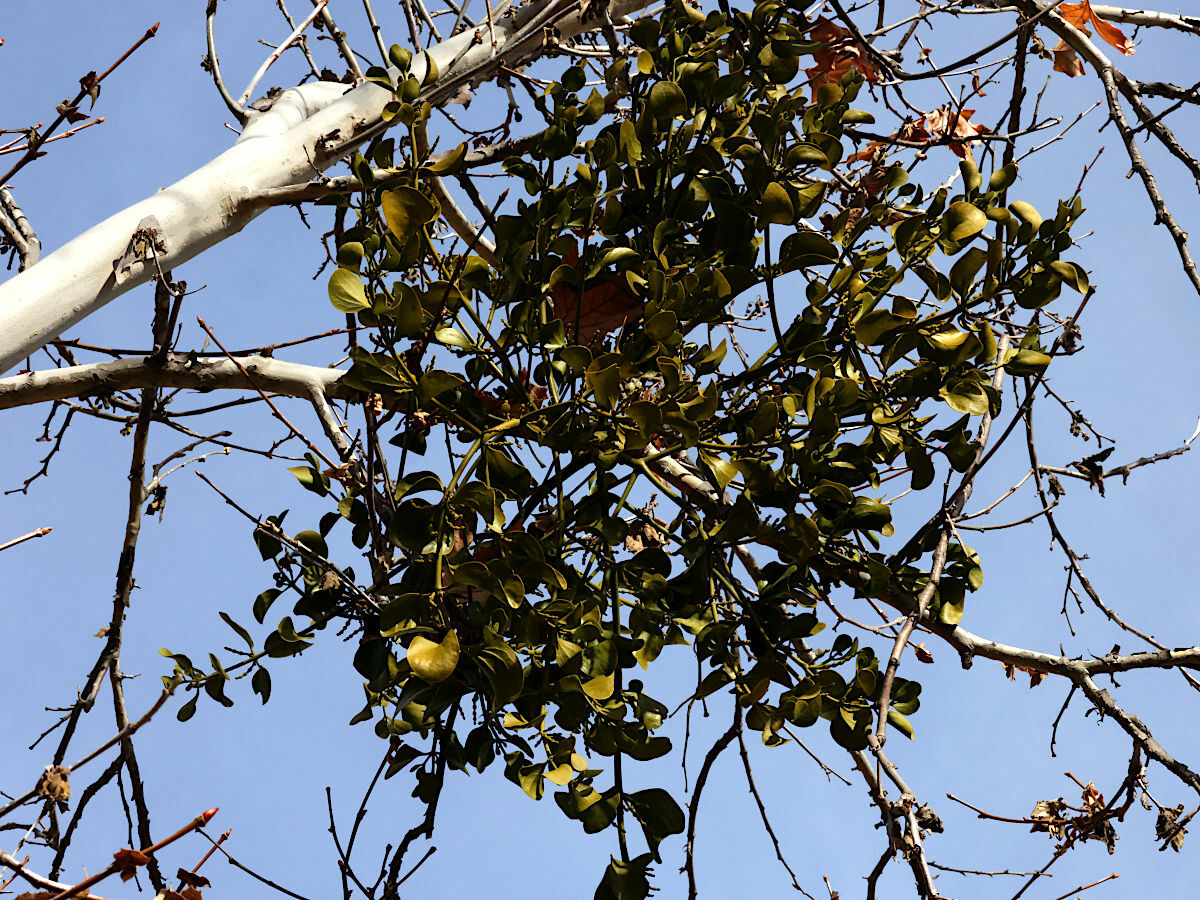
On host Platanus racemosa

Phoradendron macrophyllum is a species of flowering plant in the sandalwood family known by the common names Colorado Desert mistletoe, bigleaf mistletoe, and Christmas mistletoe. It is native to western United States and northern Mexico from Oregon to Colorado to Texas to Baja California, where it grows in many types of wooded habitat at elevations up to 1700 m (5500 feet).

This mistletoe is a parasitic plant on a variety of trees and woody shrubs, including species of alder, ash, walnut, sycamore, poplar, mesquite, and willow. It is known from over 60 species of hardwood trees, but it has not been reported on oaks.

It is a shrub producing many erect green branches which can exceed a meter long. Its stems are lined with pairs of oppositely arranged leaves, each rounded or oval in shape and 3 to 4 centimeters long. As a hemiparasite the mistletoe taps its host tree for water and nutrients but contains some chlorophyll and can photosynthesize some energy for itself as well. The plant is dioecious, with male and female individuals producing different forms of inflorescence with rough elongated clusters of flowers. Female flowers yield white to light pink spherical berries each 4 or 5 millimeters wide.
