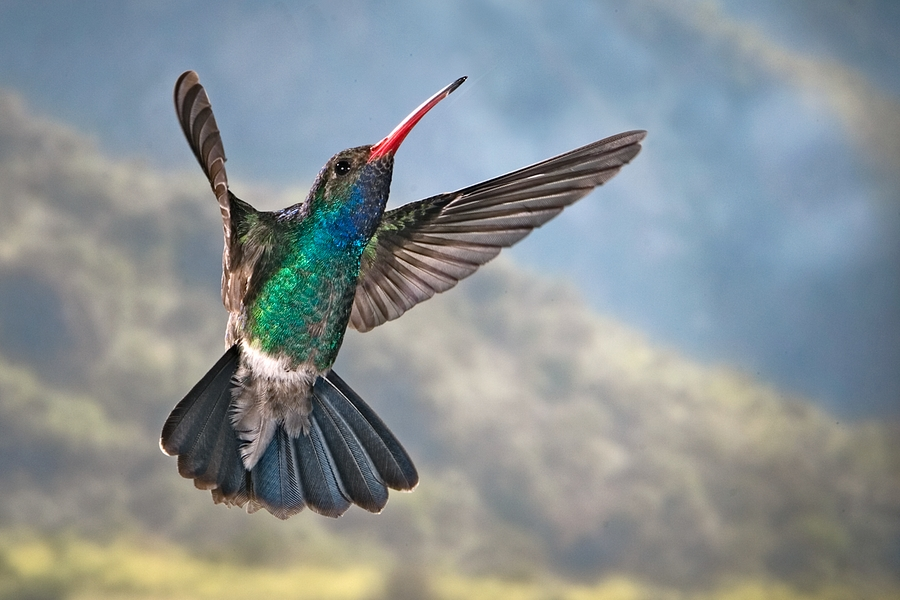
- Broad-billed hummingbird (Cynanthus latirostris)

Scientific classification
- Kingdom: Animalia
- Phylum: Chordata
- Class: Aves
- Clade: Strisores
- Order: Apodiformes
- Family: Trochilidae
- Tribe: Trochilini
- Genus: Cynanthus; Swainson, 1827

Type species
- Cynanthus latirostris Swainson, 1827

Species
- 6, see text

= Cynanthus =

Genus of birds

Cynanthus is a genus of hummingbird in the family Trochilidae. The species are found in Mexico and Central America.

== Taxonomy ==
The genus Cynanthus was introduced in 1827 by the English zoologist William Swainson. The name combines the Ancient Greek κυανος/kuanos meaning "dark-blue" with ανθος/anthos meaning "blossom" or "flower". Swainson listed four species in his new genus but did not specify the type. In 1907 the American ornithologist Witmer Stone designated the type as Cynanthus latirostris Swainson, 1827, the broad-billed hummingbird.

A 2014 molecular phylogenetic study by Jimmy McGuire and collaborators found that the genus Cynanthus was sister to the genus Chlorostilbon containing the emeralds.

== Species ==
The genus contains the following six species:

| Image | Common name | Scientific name | Distribution |
|---|---|---|---|
| | Broad-billed hummingbird | Cynanthus latirostris | |
| | Tres Marias hummingbird | Cynanthus lawrencei | |
| | Turquoise-crowned hummingbird | Cynanthus doubledayi | |
| | Golden-crowned emerald | Cynanthus auriceps | western Mexico (southern Sinaloa to Durango, Guerrero, and Oaxaca) |
| | Cozumel emerald | Cynanthus forficatus | |
| | Canivet's emerald | Cynanthus canivetii | |
