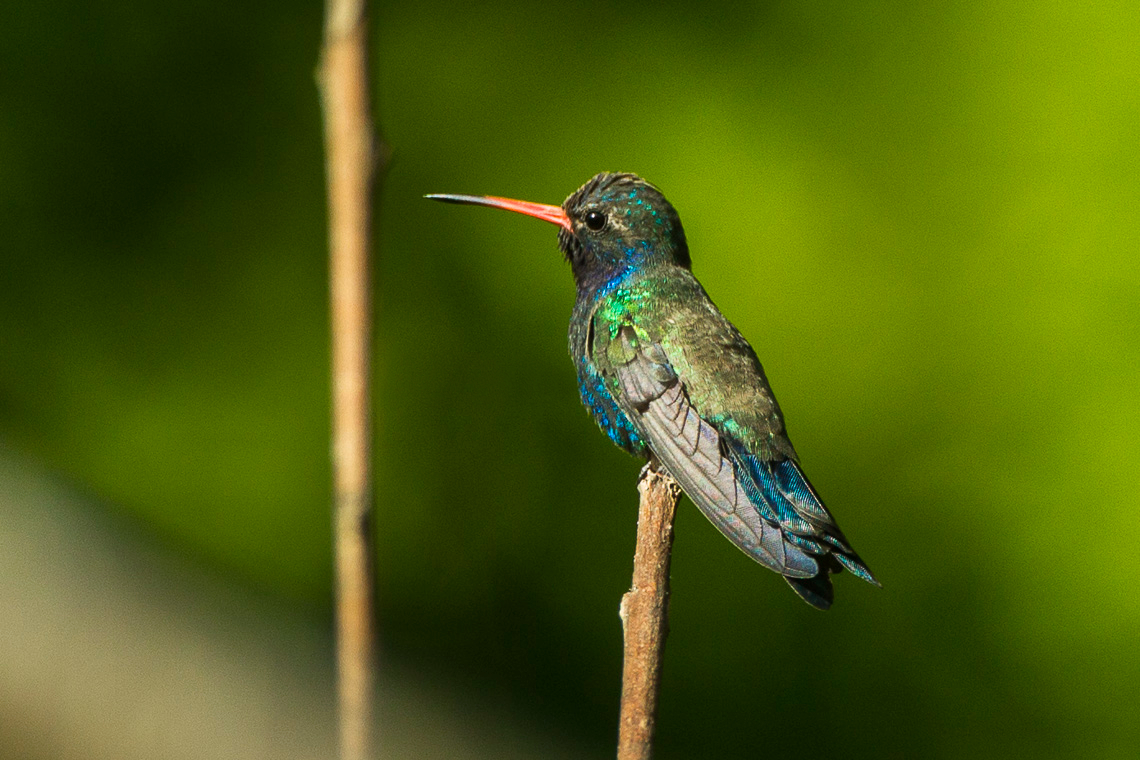

Conservation status
- Least Concern (IUCN 3.1)
- CITES Appendix II

Scientific classification
- Kingdom: Animalia
- Phylum: Chordata
- Class: Aves
- Order: Apodiformes
- Family: Trochilidae
- Genus: Cynanthus
- Species: C. doubledayi

Binomial name
- Cynanthus doubledayi (Bourcier, 1847)

= Turquoise-crowned hummingbird =

The turquoise-crowned hummingbird or Doubleday's hummingbird (Cynanthus doubledayi) is a species of hummingbird in the "emeralds", tribe Trochilini of subfamily Trochilinae. It is endemic to Mexico.

== Taxonomy and systematics ==
The International Ornithological Committee (IOC), the Clements taxonomy, and BirdLife International's Handbook of the Birds of the World consider the turquoise-crowned hummingbird to be a species. The turquoise-crowned hummingbird is monotypic: no subspecies are recognised.

== Description ==
The Cornell Lab of Ornithology's Birds of the World does not describe the turquoise-crowned hummingbird separately from the broad-billed hummingbird. The following is a Google translation of the original description's French:

"Male adult: straight beak, dilated at its base, white, and black at its extremity; round head; green cap, very brilliante has azure reflections; neck, scapular, back, cover caudal fin glossy dark green; throat, front and sides of the neck, ėpi-gastre covered with shiny bright blue scaly feathers, abdomen less blue and green on the sides; downy anal region White; slightly curved grey-black wings; cordate [notched] tail with wide and rounded rectrices, black-blue, the four middle ones ashy at their ends; bare black legs."

The Birds of the World account of the broad-billed hummingbird includes that the male turquoise-crowned hummingbird weighs about 2.4 g (0.085 oz).

== Distribution and habitat ==
The turquoise-crowned hummingbird is found in the southern Mexican states of Guerrero, Oaxaca, and Chiapas. It inhabits a variety of landscapes including arid thorn, tropical deciduous, gallery, and secondary forests. It occasionally occurs in pine-oak woodlands and grassy slopes. In elevation it generally ranges from sea level to 2,200 m (7,200 ft) but occurs as high as 3,000 m (9,800 ft).

== Behavior ==
=== Movement ===
The turquoise-crowned hummingbird is a year-round resident throughout its range.

=== Food and feeding ===
The diet of the turquoise-crowned hummingbird is not separately described from that of the broad-billed hummingbird. In general, and like most hummingbirds, that species feeds on a wide variety of flowering plants and also small arthropods. The turquoise-crowned hummingbird is described as trap-lining for nectar in gallery forest.

=== Breeding ===
The turquoise-crowned hummingbird appears to nest throughout the year; its peak season is unknown. Other information on its breeding phenology is not separated in the Birds of the World account.

=== Vocalization ===
The turquoise-crowned hummingbird's vocalizations have not been separately described from those of the broad-billed hummingbird. That species' song, sung only by males, "[b]egins with short chip note, then a series of similar notes ranging in frequency from 2 to 13 kHz."

== Status ==
The IUCN has assessed the turquoise-crowned hummingbird as being of Least Concern. Though its population size is not known it is believed to be stable. No specific threats have been identified. "Resident populations of broad-billed hummingbird in Mexico might...be impacted by habitat loss, but this has not been studied."
