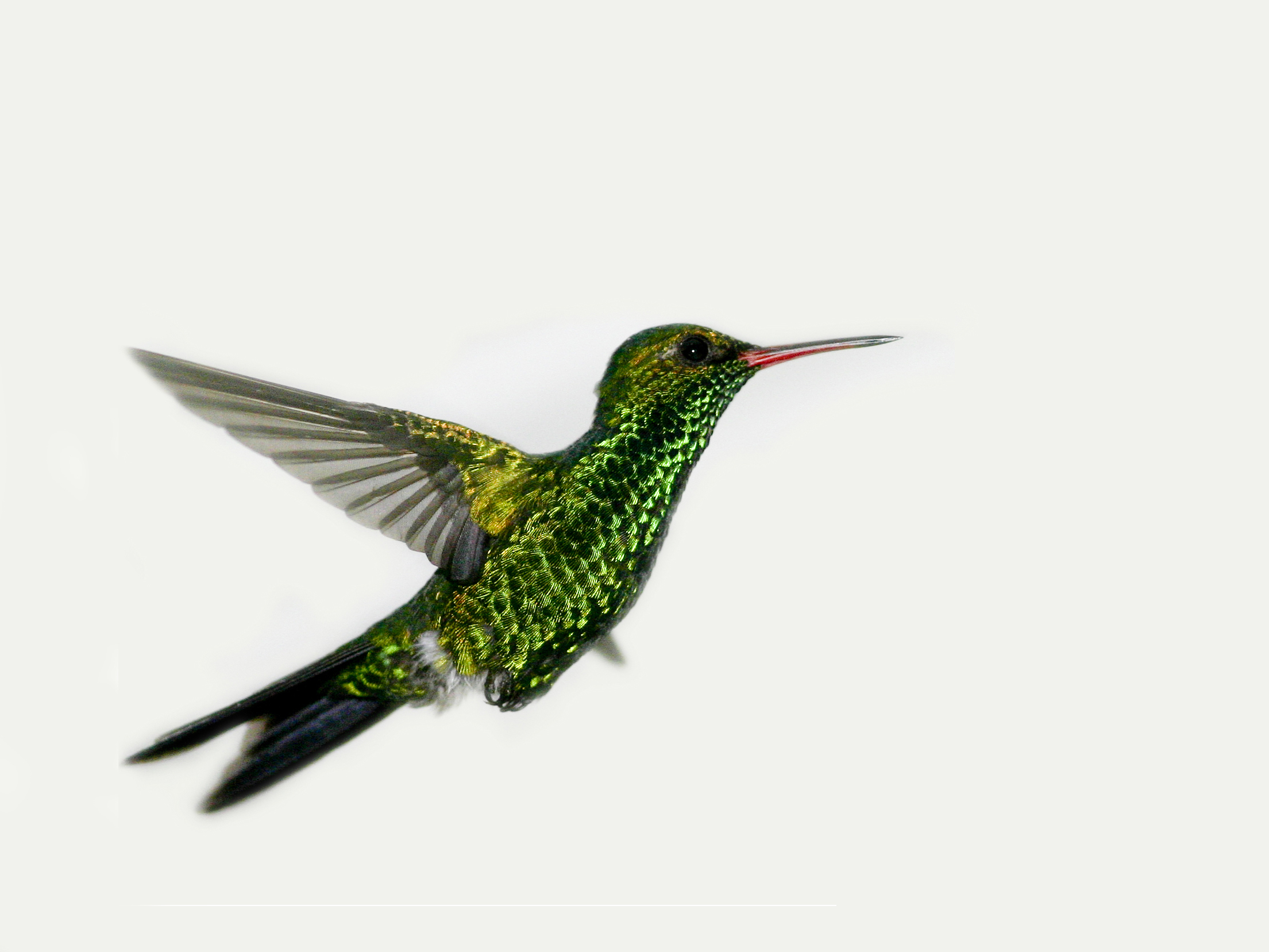
- Utila, Honduras

Conservation status
- Least Concern (IUCN 3.1)
- CITES Appendix II (CITES)

Scientific classification
- Kingdom: Animalia
- Phylum: Chordata
- Class: Aves
- Clade: Strisores
- Order: Apodiformes
- Family: Trochilidae
- Genus: Cynanthus
- Species: C. canivetii

Binomial name
- Cynanthus canivetii (Lesson, 1832)
- Range of C. canivetii

Synonyms
- Chlorostilbon canivetii

= Canivet's emerald =

Species of hummingbird

Canivet's emerald (Cynanthus canivetii) is a species of hummingbird in the "emeralds", tribe Trochilini of subfamily Trochilinae. It is found in Belize, Costa Rica, El Salvador, Guatemala, Honduras, Mexico, and Nicaragua.

== Taxonomy and systematics ==
The taxonomic history of Canivet's emerald is complicated. The North American Classification Committee of the American Ornithological Society, the International Ornithological Committee (IOC), and the Clements taxonomy assign it the binomial Cynanthus canivetii. However, as of 2020 BirdLife International's Handbook of the Birds of the World (HBW) retains it in its earlier genus Chlorostilbon.

As currently (2022) accepted by the above three worldwide taxonomic systems, Canivet's emerald has three subspecies, the nominate Cynanthus canivetii canivetii, C. c. osberti, and C. c. salvini. However, some authors treat the last two as a single subspecies or species, Salvin's emerald. Others expand C. canivetii to include all of the species now in genus Chlorostilbon under the binomial Chlorostilbon canivetii and the English name fork-tailed emerald, and still others call this combined entity the blue-tailed emerald (Chlorostilbon mellisugus). In addition, what is now the garden emerald (Chlorstilbon assimilis) has been proposed as a subspecies of Canivet's emerald.

The common name and Latin binomial commemorate the French ornithologist Emmanuel Canivet de Carentan.

== Description ==
Male Canivet's emeralds are 7.8 to 9.3 cm (3.1 to 3.7 in) long and weigh 2.1 to 2.8 g (0.074 to 0.099 oz). Females are 7.5 to 8.6 cm (3.0 to 3.4 in) long and weigh about 2.3 g (0.081 oz). Males of the nominate subspecies have a red bill with a black tip. Their crown is bright golden to golden green and the rest of the upperparts a less brilliant golden green. Their underparts are brilliant golden green with white tibal tufts. The tail is long and forked, blue-black or black with a blue gloss, and the central two or three pairs of feathers have dark brownish gray tips. The female's maxilla is black and the mandible red with a black tip. Its upperparts and flanks are bright metallic green to bronze green that is duller on the crown. It has a grayish white stripe behind the eye and dusky cheeks. Its underparts are light gray. Its tail is not as long or deeply forked as the male's. The central pair of tail feathers are metallic green to bluish green and the next three pairs are the same color with a black band near the end and white tips. The outermost pair has a dusky base and brownish gray and black bands near the end.

Subspecies C. c. osberti is similar to the nominate, but the male has a shorter and less deeply forked tail and the gray tips on the central tail feathers are narrower and darker. C. c. salvini males are also similar to the nominate, but have a dusky rather than red maxilla and dark sooty gray tips on the central tail feathers.

== Distribution and habitat ==
The nominate subspecies of Canivet's emerald is found in eastern Mexico from Tamaulipas to Yucatán and beyond through Belize and northern Guatemala into Honduras (including its offshore islands). C. c. osberti is found from Chiapas in southern Mexico through central and western Guatemala, El Salvador, and Honduras into western Nicaragua. C. c. salvini is found on the Pacific side of northwestern Costa Rica. The species inhabits arid to semi-humid, semi-open to open, landscapes such as the edges and clearings of evergreen forest and secondary forest, scrubby savannas, and gardens. In much of its range it occurs from sea level to 1,900 m (6,200 ft) but only about as high as 1,500 m (4,900 ft) in Costa Rica.

== Behavior ==
=== Movement ===
Canivet's emerald is a year-round resident throughout its range.

=== Feeding ===
Canivet's emerald forages for nectar by trap-lining, visiting a circuit of flowering plants and not defending a feeding territory. It often feeds at small flowers that are ignored by other hummingbirds. It tends to feed from near the ground to the middle strata of the vegetation. It holds its tail partly open and wags it when nectaring. In addition to nectar, it feeds on small arthropods.

=== Breeding ===
The breeding seasons of Canivet's emerald vary across its range. It spans February to May in eastern Mexico, December to February in El Salvador, November to March or April in Costa Rica, and apparently includes May in Honduras. The nest is a cup made of plant fibers and down with bits of bark on the outside; it is typically placed 1 to 3 m (3 to 10 ft) above the ground. The incubation period and time to fledging are unknown.

=== Vocalization ===
What is thought to be the Canivet's emerald song is "an endlessly repeated, characterless wiry tseee tseeree". Its call has been described as "a dry, scratchy chut or chit, sometimes run together into a soft, staccato chatter"

== Status ==
The IUCN has assessed Canivet's emerald as being of Least Concern. It has a very large range and an estimated population of at least 500,000 mature individuals that is believed to be stable. "Human activity probably has little short term effect on Canivet's Emerald, which occupies edge and disturbed habitats, including gardens."
