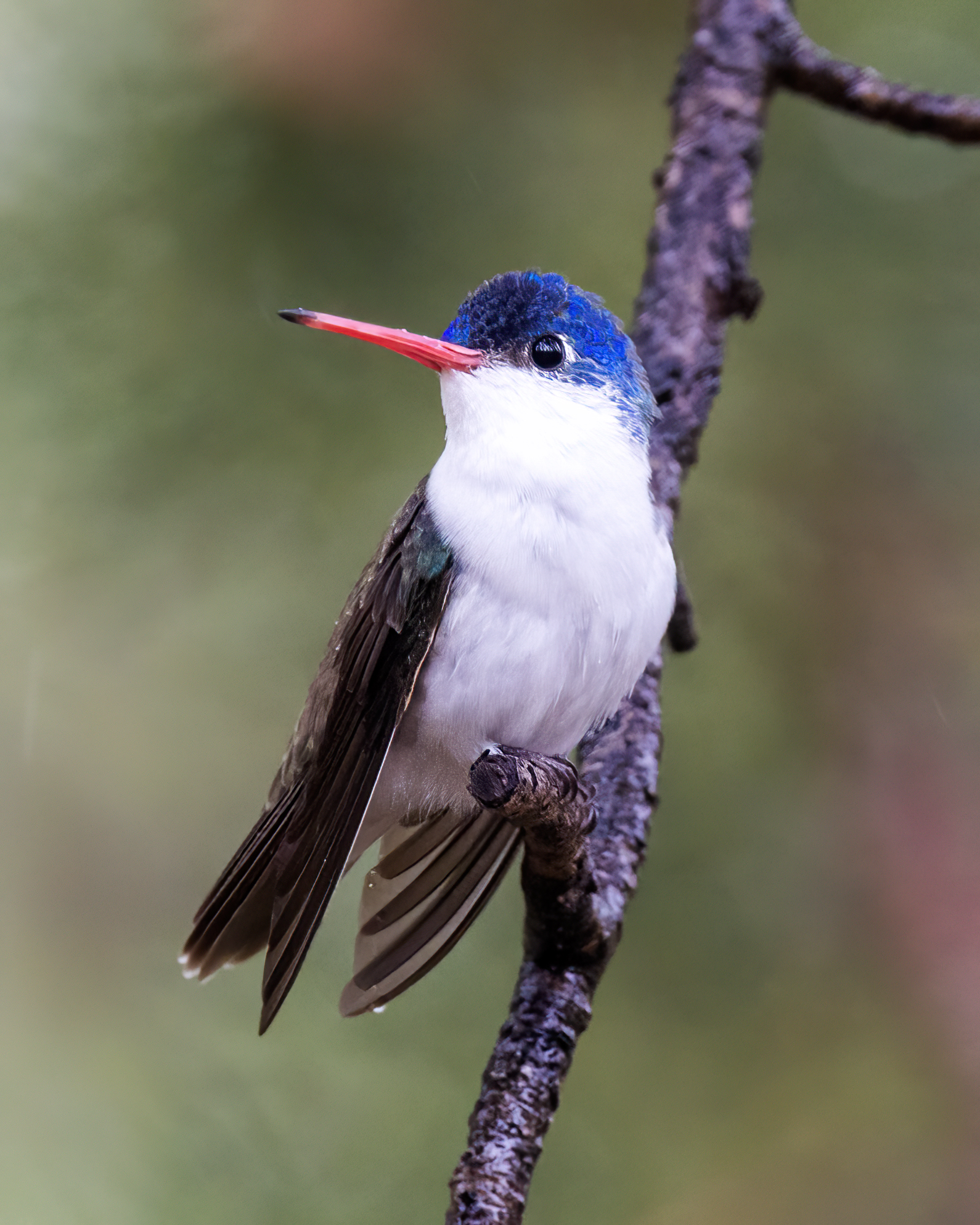

Conservation status
- Least Concern (IUCN 3.1)
- CITES Appendix II

Scientific classification
- Kingdom: Animalia
- Phylum: Chordata
- Class: Aves
- Clade: Strisores
- Order: Apodiformes
- Family: Trochilidae
- Genus: Ramosomyia
- Species: R. violiceps

Binomial name
- Ramosomyia violiceps (Gould, 1859)

Synonyms
- Cyanomyia violiceps, Leucolia violiceps, Amazilia violiceps

= Violet-crowned hummingbird =

Species of bird

The violet-crowned hummingbird (Ramosomyia violiceps) is a hummingbird in the "emeralds", tribe Trochilini of subfamily Trochilinae. It is found in Mexico and the southwestern United States.

== Taxonomy and systematics ==
The violet-crowned hummingbird was formerly placed in the genus Amazilia. A molecular phylogenetic study published in 2014 found that Amazilia was polyphyletic. In the revised classification to create monophyletic genera, the violet-crowned hummingbird was one of three species moved to the resurrected genus Leucolia by some taxonomic systems. However, a study published in 2021 showed that Leucolia was not available because of the principle of priority. The authors proposed the new genus Ramosomyia and in mid-2022 it was adopted by the North American Classification Committee of the American Ornithological Society and the International Ornithological Committee. As of that date the Clements taxonomy retains the species in Leucolia and BirdLife International's Handbook of the Birds of the World in the earlier Amazilia.

The violet-crowned hummingbird has two subspecies, the nominate R. v. violiceps and R. v. ellioti.

== Description ==
The violet-crowned hummingbird is 10 to 11.5 cm (3.9 to 4.5 in) long and weighs 5.1 to 5.8 g (0.18 to 0.20 oz). Both sexes of both subspecies have a bright red bill, sometimes with a black tip. Adult males of the nominate subspecies have an intense violet-blue crown, a bluish violet hindneck, and dull grayish brown to greenish brown back and rump. Their tail is coppery bronze. Their underside from throat to undertail coverts is pure white with light olive green flanks. Adult females are virtually identical, though in general somewhat duller overall. Males of subspecies R. v. ellioti are similar to the nominate. However, their crown is more turquoise blue and their tail greenish bronze. Females again are almost identical but duller.

== Distribution and habitat ==
The violet-crowned hummingbird's subspecies R. v. ellioti is the more northern. It is found from southeastern Arizona and southwestern New Mexico south into Mexico to Michoacán and Hidalgo and possibly as far as the states of Puebla and México. In Arizona and New Mexico it occurs almost entirely between 1,200 and 1,700 m (3,900 and 5,600 ft). In Sonora it occurs between 200 and 1,300 m (660 and 4,300 ft) and extends its elevational range further south. The nominate A. v. violiceps is found from extreme eastern and southern Michoacán south into northwestern Oaxaca. In this southern part of its range it is typically found between 200 and 1,400 m (660 and 4,600 ft) but ranges overall from sea level to 2,400 m (7,900 ft). The nominate and the southerly population of ellioti inhabit a variety of landscapes including riparian corridors in thorn scrub, deciduous and pine-oak forest, fields, orchards, and urban and suburban parks and gardens.

== Behavior ==
=== Movement ===
The violet-crowned hummingbird's populations in the U.S. and well into Sonora and Chihuahua are mostly migratory, but some individuals have overwintered as far north as Arizona. The increasing numbers of breeding and non-breeding observations in the U.S. suggest that the species "is best viewed as a wanderer that is expanding its range northward." From southern Sonora and Chihuahua it is essentially sedentary, though it appears to makes some movements to follow food resources.

=== Feeding ===
The violet-crowned hummingbird forages for nectar while hovering; it feeds from a wide variety of flowering plants and shrubs. Where flowers are plentiful it and other hummingbirds appear to feed with little agonistic behavior but where they are scarce this species attempts to defend flower patches from smaller hummingbirds. In addition to nectar, it feeds on small insects by hawking from a perch and also by hover-gleaning from vegetation.

=== Breeding ===
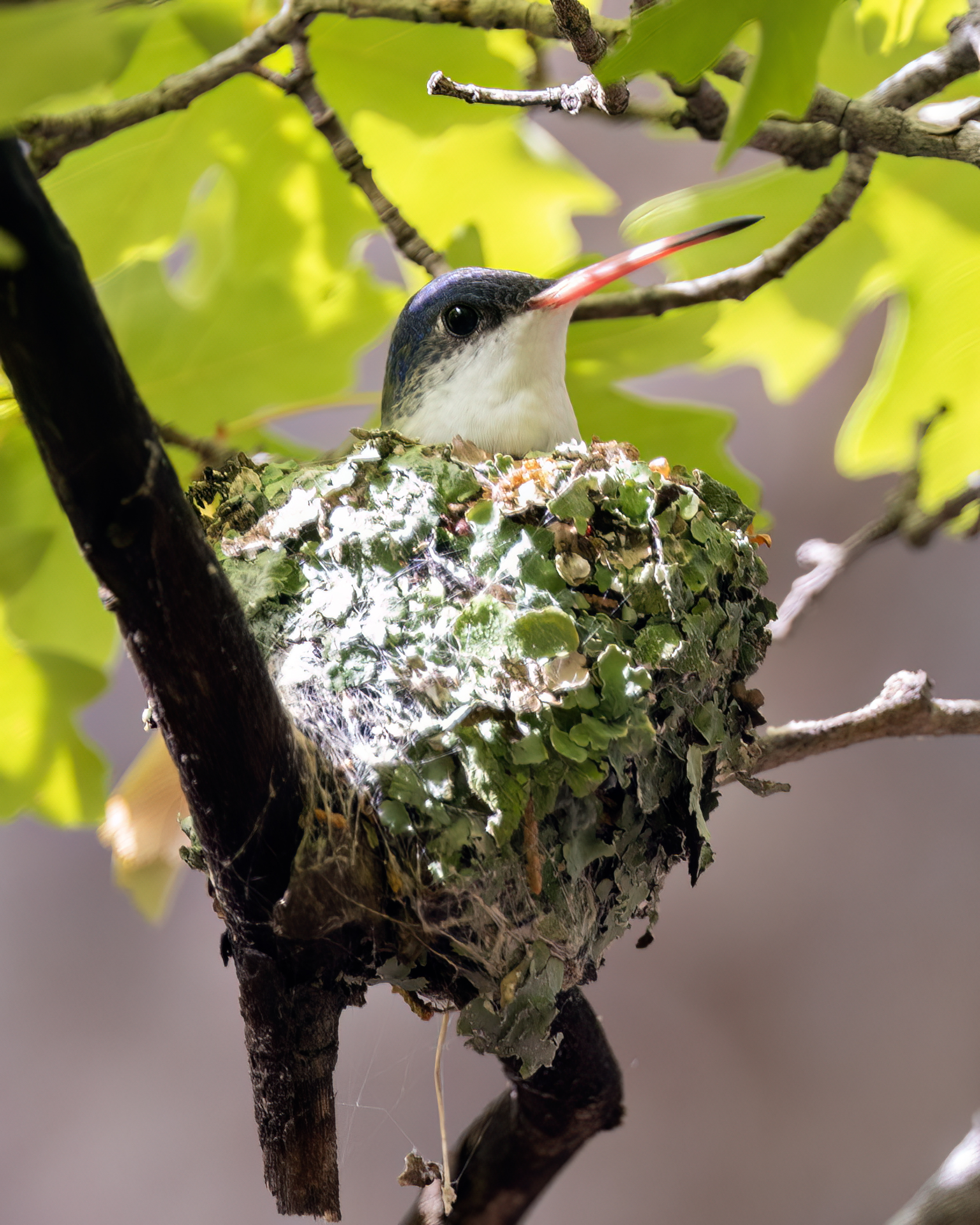
A violet-crowned hummingbird in a nest in Ramsey Canyon, Arizona

In Arizona and New Mexico the violet-crowned hummingbird breeds from April to September. There it nests mostly in Arizona sycamore (Platanus wrightii). In Mexico it breeds mostly between March and August but individuals have been seen nesting at almost any time of year. Little is known about its nesting habits there. The species' nests themselves vary somewhat depending on available plant material. In general they are cups of soft plant down bound with spiderweb with lichen on the outside. The only known clutches were of two eggs. The incubation length and time to fledging are not known.

=== Vocalization ===
One description of the violet-crowned hummingbird's song is "a series of very high, thin, descending notes seew seew seew seew seew". It is sung from an exposed perch. One of its calls is described as "a rather dry tak or chap or as a hard chip, stik or tik", and it makes a wide variety of other calls when interacting with other hummingbirds.

== Status ==
The IUCN has assessed the violet-crowned hummingbird as being of Least Concern. It has a large range and its estimated population of two million mature individuals is believed to be stable. No immediate threats have been identified.
