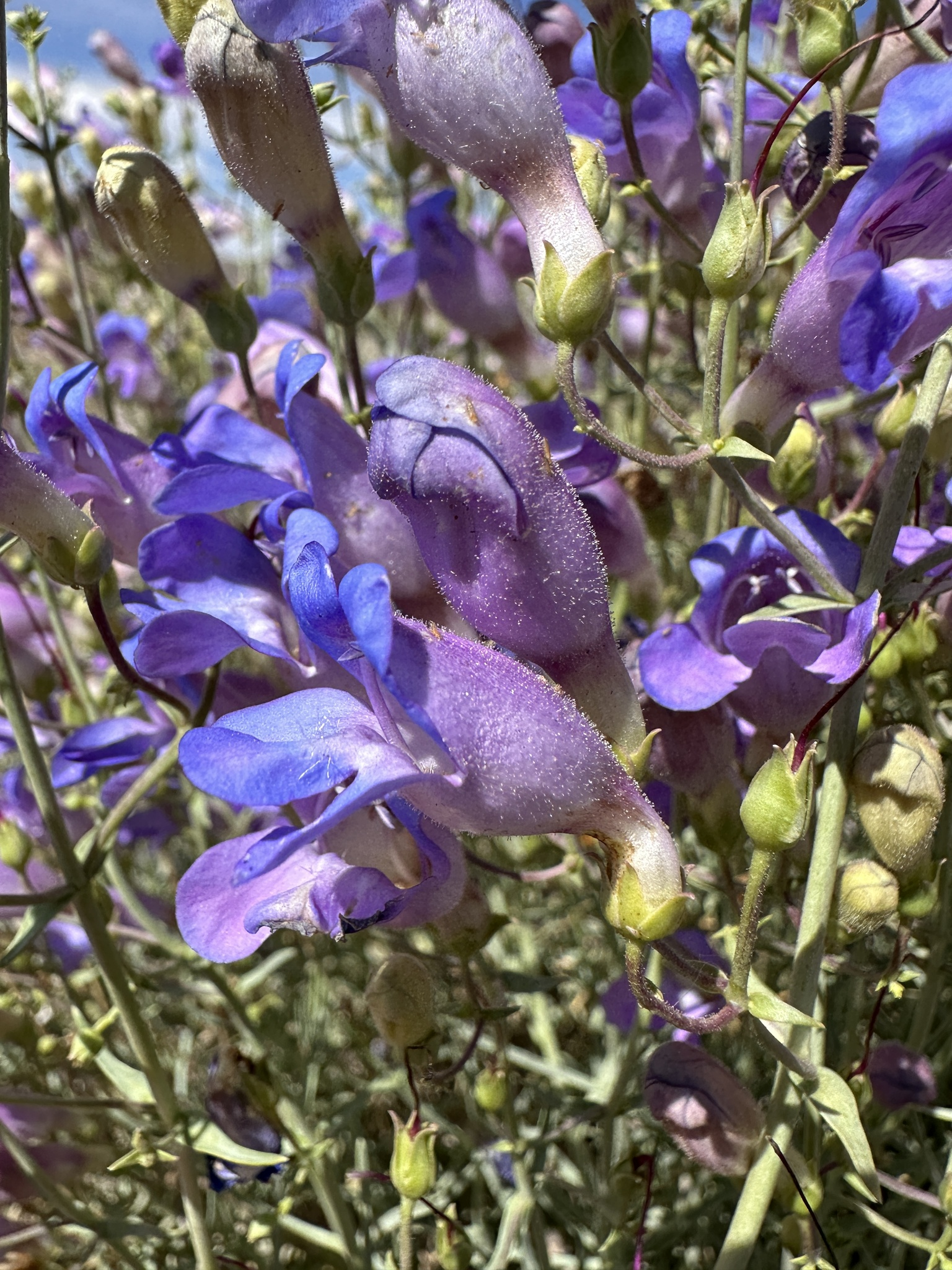

Conservation status
- Vulnerable (NatureServe)

Scientific classification
- Kingdom: Plantae
- Clade: Tracheophytes
- Clade: Angiosperms
- Clade: Eudicots
- Clade: Asterids
- Order: Lamiales
- Family: Plantaginaceae
- Genus: Penstemon
- Species: P. incertus

Binomial name
- Penstemon incertus Brandeg.

= Penstemon incertus =

Species of flowering plant

Penstemon incertus is a species of penstemon known by the common name Mojave beardtongue. It is endemic to California, where it can be found in many of the southeastern mountain ranges, including the southern reaches of the Sierra Nevada, the Tehachapis, and the mountains of the Mojave Desert region. It is a member of the flora in scrub and woodland, among Joshua Trees and in sandy washes.

It is a rounded, branching, erect shrub reaching one meter in maximum height. The thick leaves are linear to lance-shaped with rolled, untoothed edges and reaching up to 7 centimetres (2.8 in). The glandular inflorescence produces several wide-mouthed tubular or funnel-shaped flowers measuring 2 to 3 cm (0.8 to 1.2 in) long. The flowers are blue-purple, glandular on the outer surface and mostly hairless inside except for the hairy staminode.
