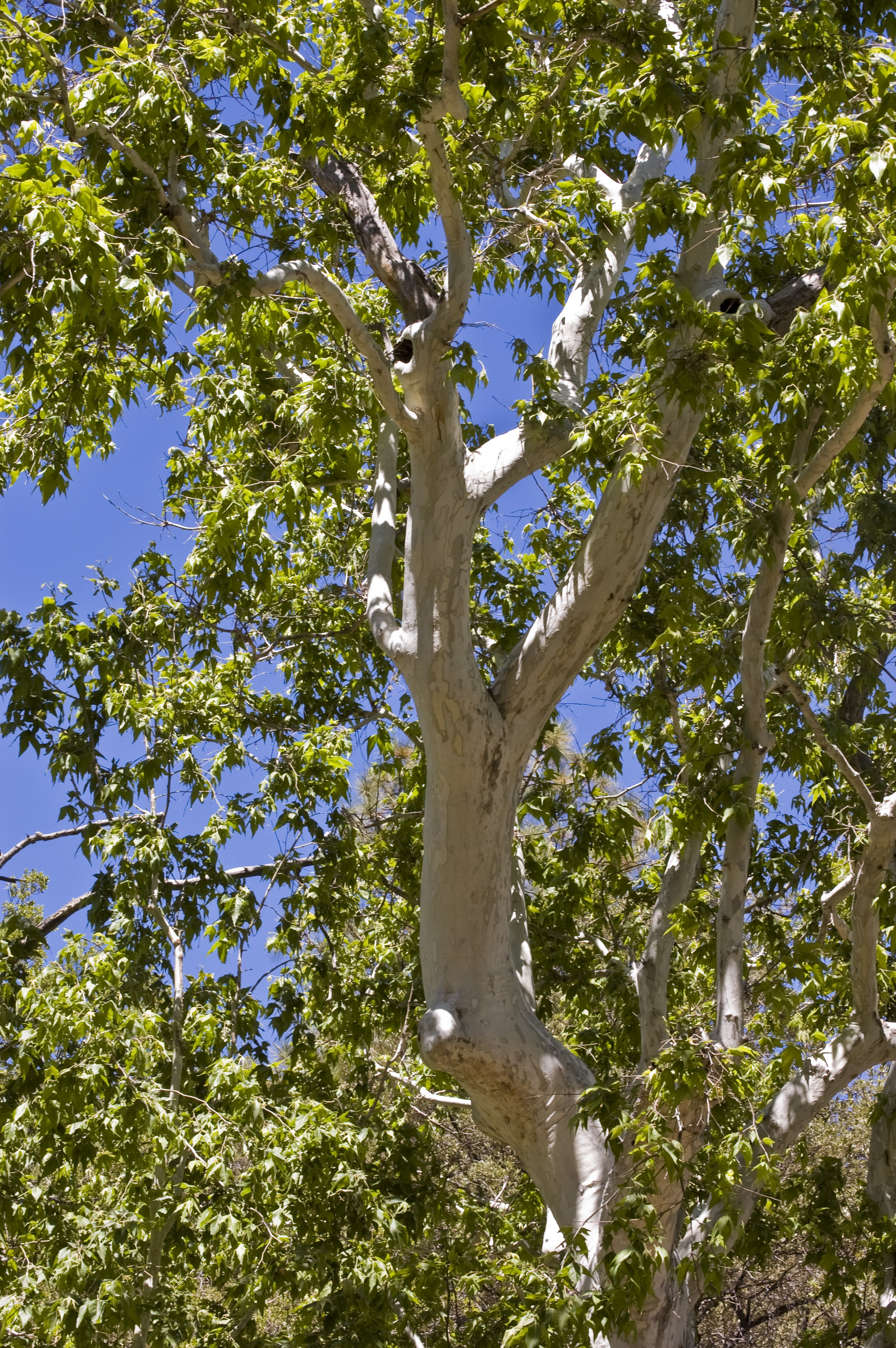

Conservation status
- Least Concern (IUCN 3.1)

Scientific classification
- Kingdom: Plantae
- Clade: Tracheophytes
- Clade: Angiosperms
- Clade: Eudicots
- Order: Proteales
- Family: Platanaceae
- Genus: Platanus
- Species: P. wrightii

Binomial name
- Platanus wrightii S.Watson
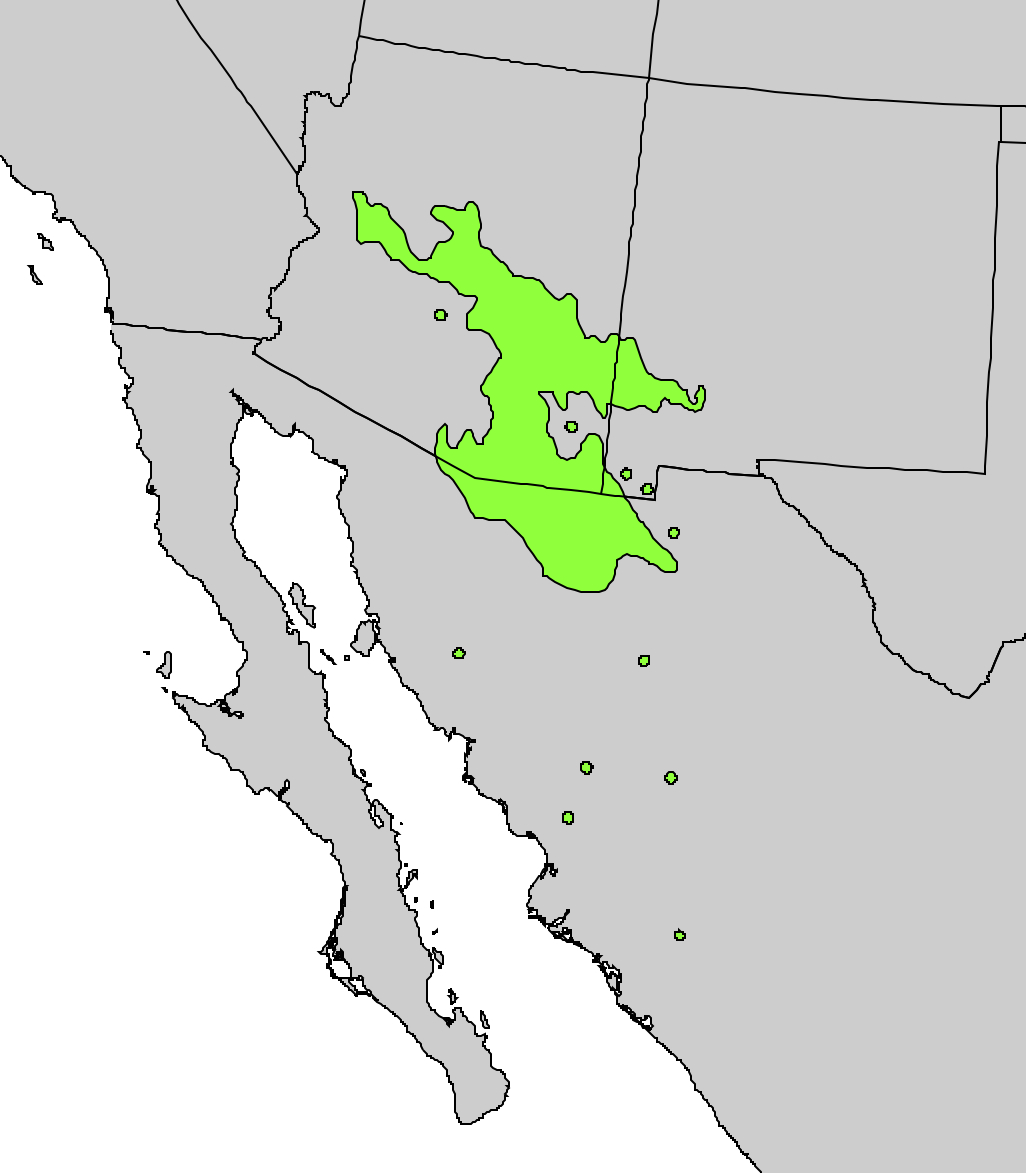
- Natural range

Synonyms
- Platanus mexicana Torr. (Illegitimate); Platanus racemosa subsp. wrightii (S. Watson) A.E. Murray; Platanus racemosa var. wrightii (S. Watson) L.D. Benson

= Platanus wrightii =

Species of tree

Platanus wrightii, the Arizona sycamore, is a sycamore tree native to Arizona and New Mexico with its range extending south into the Mexican states of Sonora, Chihuahua, and Sinaloa.

The tree is a large deciduous tree, growing up to 82 ft (25 m).

== Distribution ==
The Arizona sycamore is a tree of central Arizona's transition zone in the Mogollon Rim–White Mountains. The range extends into southwest New Mexico and parts of Sonora, Chihuahua, and Sinaloa in Mexico. In Arizona, the range extends south towards northern Sonora. The range in southeast Arizona is a northeasterly part of the Sonoran Desert, and is at the northern region of the Sierra Madre Occidental cordillera.

Arizona sycamore is prevalent in riparian areas of the Madrean Sky Islands, mountain sky islands in southeast Arizona, extreme southwest, Bootheel region of New Mexico and along the San Francisco River in Western New Mexico, northeastern Sonora, and extreme northwest Chihuahua. The species is more prevalent west of the Madrean Sky Islands region, still in the central and northeast Sonoran Desert, an area around the Organ Pipe Cactus National Monument at the Arizona-Sonora border, with the species range extending in Sonora in the Occidentals, or its western foothills. Scattered reports have been made further east in the Sierra Madre Occidental.

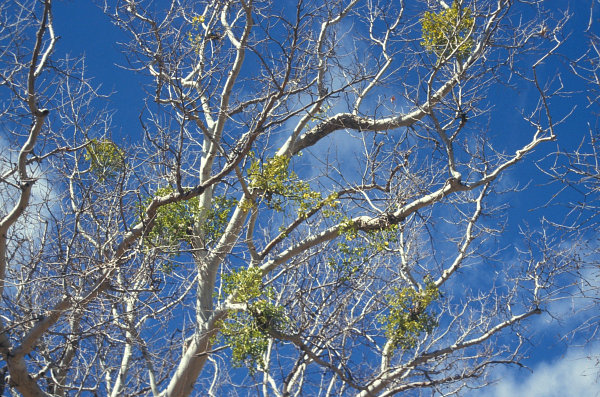
Colorado Desert mistletoe on host tree Platanus wrightii

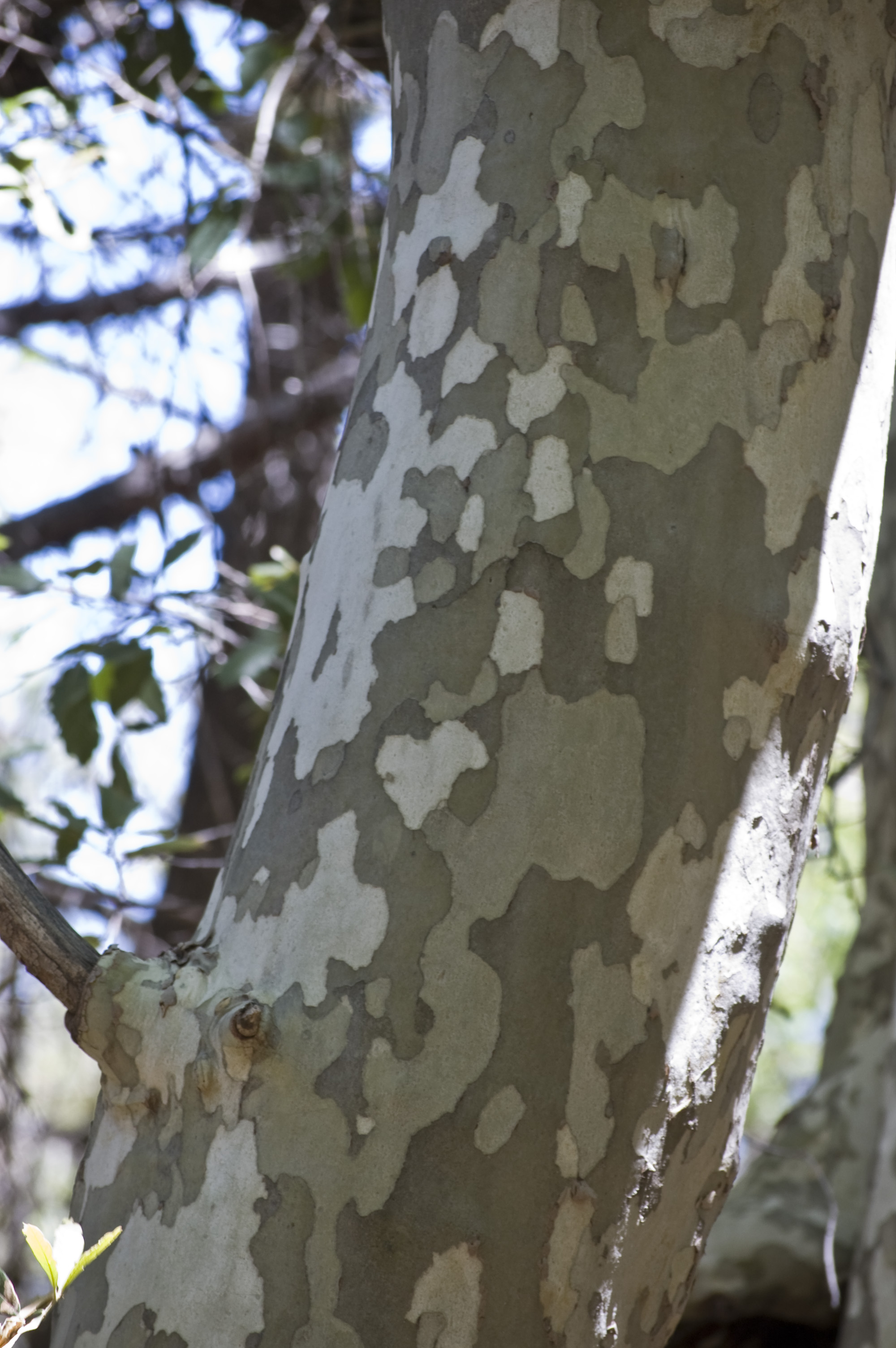
bark
