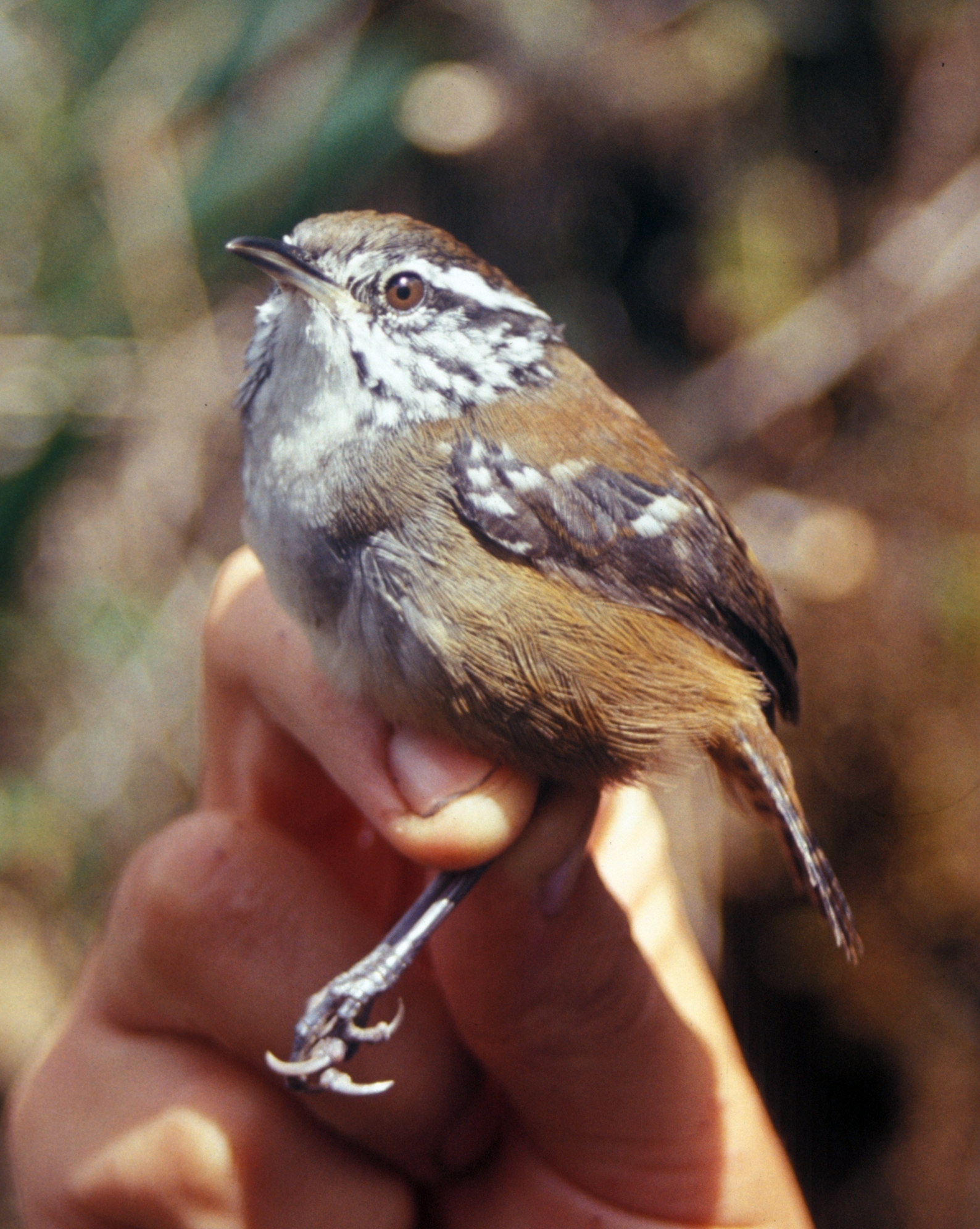

Conservation status
- Least Concern (IUCN 3.1)

Scientific classification
- Kingdom: Animalia
- Phylum: Chordata
- Class: Aves
- Order: Passeriformes
- Family: Troglodytidae
- Genus: Henicorhina
- Species: H. leucoptera

Binomial name
- Henicorhina leucoptera Fitzpatrick, Terborgh & Willard, 1977

Audio

= Bar-winged wood wren =

Species of bird

The bar-winged wood wren (Henicorhina leucoptera) is a species of bird in the family Troglodytidae. It is found in southern Ecuador and northern Peru.

== Taxonomy and systematics ==
The bar-winged wood wren was originally thought to be closely related to the grey-breasted wood wren (Henicorhina leucophrys) but later DNA studies showed that it is more closely related to the white-breasted wood wren (H. leucosticta). It is monotypic.

== Description ==
The bar-winged wood wren is approximately 11 cm (4.3 in) long. The adult's crown is light gray-brown darkening to dusky brown on the upper back. Its lower back and rump are reddish brown. The tail is black with some fine dusky bars. Its folded wing shows two prominent white bars formed by the tips of the coverts. It has a wide white supercilium, a broken white eye ring, a black patch behind the eye, and a black and white streaked cheek. Its chin, throat, and upper breast are off-white mottled with pale gray. The center of the belly is white darkening to pale cinnamon on the lower belly and darker cinnamon in the vent area. The juvenile's underside is dark gray, brown, and cinnamon and it does not show wing bars.

== Distribution and habitat ==
The bar-winged wood wren is found on the east slope of the Andes of southeastern Ecuador and northern Peru. It inhabits the understory of elfin forest, a biome found mostly on separate ridges with poor soils. In Ecuador it ranges in elevation between 1,700 and 1,950 m (5,580 and 6,400 ft) and in Peru between 1,350 and 2,600 m (4,430 and 8,530 ft).

== Behavior ==
=== Feeding ===
The bar-winged wood wren is known to be insectivorous but no other details of its diet have been published. It forages on and near the ground, making short flights and probing and gleaning vegetation for prey.

=== Breeding ===
Virtually nothing is known about the bar-winged wood-wren's breeding phenology. A juvenile was collected in July.

=== Vocalization ===
The bar-winged wood wren's song is "a mellow, whistled warbling phrase", often sung as a duet by a pair. Its calls include "a dry tchut" and "a squeaky wink".

== Conservation status ==
The IUCN has assessed the bar-winged wood wren as Least Concern. It has a small geographic range and specialized habitat requirements. Nevertheless, it is "'fairly common' in Ecuador [and] 'plentiful' at the type locality in Peru".
