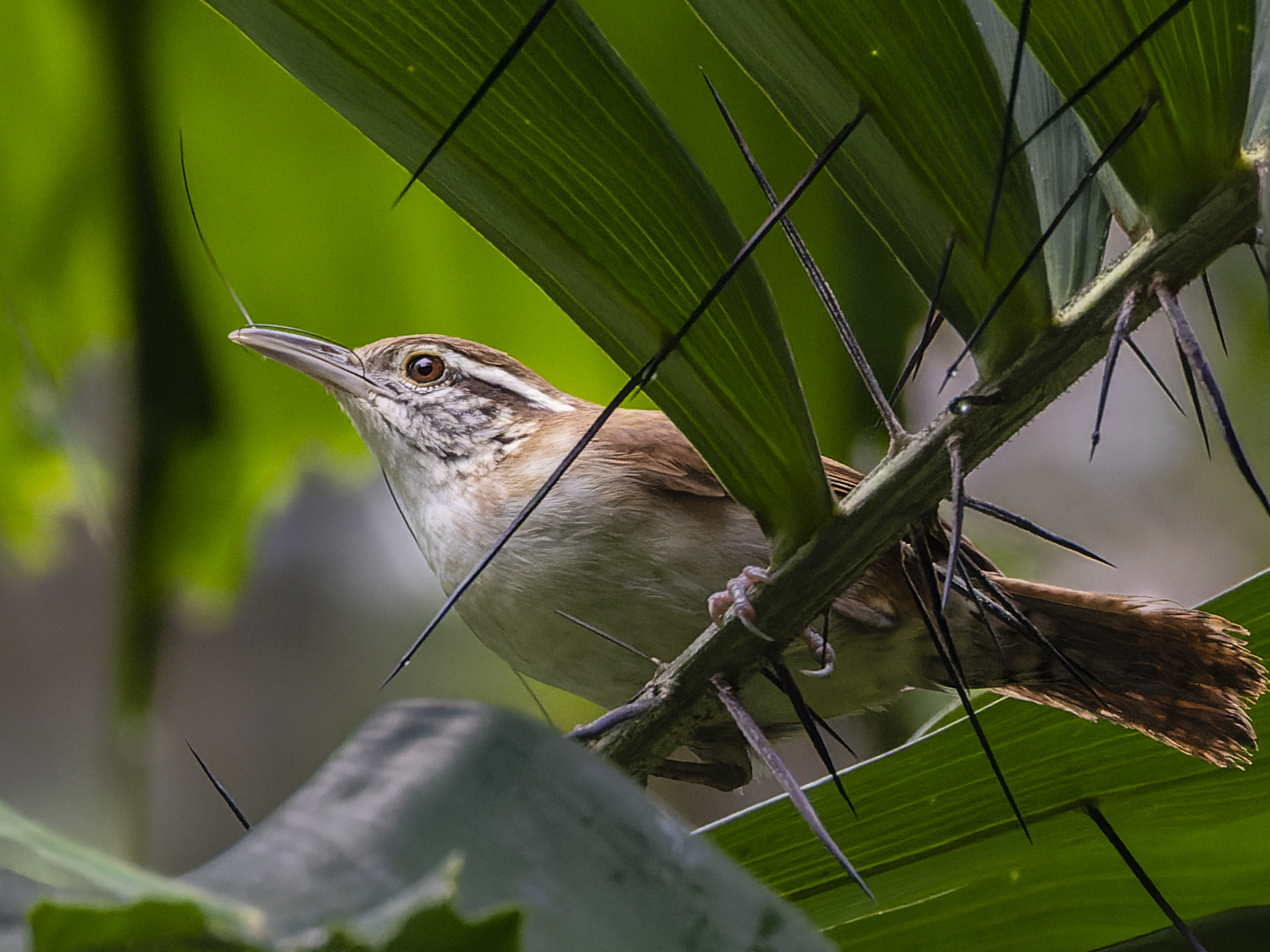

Conservation status
- Vulnerable (IUCN 3.1)

Scientific classification
- Domain: Eukaryota
- Kingdom: Animalia
- Phylum: Chordata
- Class: Aves
- Order: Passeriformes
- Family: Troglodytidae
- Genus: Thryophilus
- Species: T. sernai

Binomial name
- Thryophilus sernai Lara et al., 2012

= Antioquia wren =

Species of bird

The Antioquia wren (Thryophilus sernai) is a passerine from the wren family (Troglodytidae). It was discovered in March 2010 in the vicinity of the Cauca River in Antioquia, Colombia and described as a new species by Lara et al (2012). The epithet commemorates the late Marco Antonio Serna Díaz (1936–1991), a Colombian naturalist from San Vicente Ferrer, Antioquia.

The Antioquia wren is closely related to the rufous-and-white wren and the Niceforo's wren. It occurs on both banks of the Cauca River Canyon but it is uncommon throughout its range. Its habitat is dry forests.

Principal threats to the species include habitat destruction caused by the building of the Ituango Dam.

A study was performed in 2020 of the genetic variance of the species of this bird. Zapata and Guitirrez focused specifically the Mitochondrial Control system, which for these birds specifically holds 17 microsattelites, and 6 Toll like receptors, which are known to play a key part in the immune system of these birds. As mentioned before, these birds are primarily found in the north tropical dryforest in Columbia. The birds were tested for these 3 genetic markers, and Zapata and his colleagues found that there was little variation in the genes that they looked at. Due to this low genetic diversity, hope for the Antiquia Wren to not stay extinct is low, as genetic variability has a fundamental role in evolution and sustaining endangered populations.
