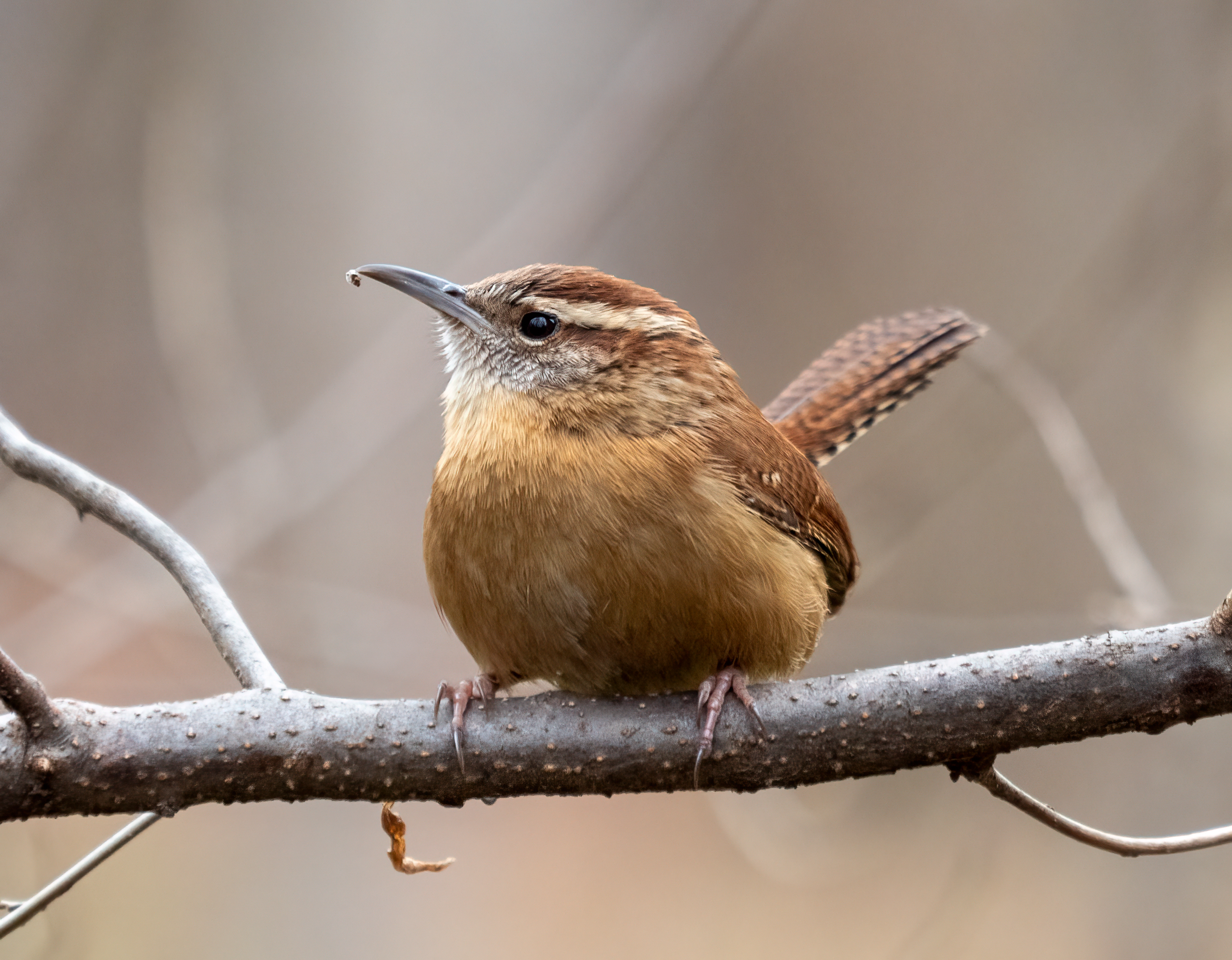
- Prospect Park, Brooklyn

Conservation status
- Least Concern (IUCN 3.1)

Scientific classification
- Kingdom: Animalia
- Phylum: Chordata
- Class: Aves
- Order: Passeriformes
- Family: Troglodytidae
- Genus: Thryothorus; Vieillot, 1816
- Species: T. ludovicianus

Binomial name
- Thryothorus ludovicianus (Latham, 1790)

Subspecies
- List: T. l. albinucha; T. l. berlandieri; T. l. burleighi; T. l. lomitensis; T. l. ludovicianus; T. l. miamensis; T. l. nesophilus; T. l. oberholseri; T. l. tropicalis; T. l. subfulvus
- Range of the Carolina wren (T. ludovicianus)

Synonyms
- Sylvia ludoviciana (Latham, 1790)

Audio
- Recorded in Cape May, New Jersey, US

= Carolina wren =

Species of bird

Thryothorus ludovicianus

The Carolina wren (Thryothorus ludovicianus) is a species of wren common in the eastern United States, the extreme south of Ontario, Canada, the northeast and southeast of Mexico, and into northern Central America. Severe winters restrict the northern limits of their range, while favorable weather conditions lead to a northward extension of their breeding range. Their preferred habitat is in dense cover in forest, farm edges, and suburban areas. This wren is the state bird of South Carolina.

Ten subspecies are recognized, occurring across the range of the species; they differ slightly in song and appearance. It is generally inconspicuous, avoiding the open for extended periods of time. When out in the open, they energetically investigate their surroundings and are rarely stationary. After finding a mate, pairs maintain a territory and stay together for several years. Both males and females give out alarm calls, but only males sing to advertise territory. Carolina wrens raise multiple broods during the summer breeding season but can fall victim to brood parasitism by brown-headed cowbirds, among other species.

== Taxonomy ==
The Carolina wren was first described under the name of Sylvia ludoviciana by John Latham in 1790. (Note: Johann Friedrich Gmelin wrongly associated the Carolina wren with the European wrens under the name Motacilla troglodytes (originally coined by Carl Linnaeus in Systema Naturae) in 1788.) Louis Pierre Vieillot at first considered all wrens under the genus Troglodytes and called the Carolina wren Troglodytes arundinaceus, but subsequently placed it in a separate genus Thryothorus (initially misspelled Thriothorus) that he created in 1816.

=== Etymology ===
The genus name Thryothorus is of Greek origin from the combination of the noun θρύον : thrýon ("rush, reed") and the adjective θοῦρος : thoũros ("rushing, impetuous"; derivative of verb θρῴσκειν : thrōskein to leap up, spring, jump at). Thus, Thryothorus means 'reed jumper'.

Its specific name ludovicianus is a post-classical Latin term for Ludovicus (derivative from Louis XIV) meaning 'of Louisiana' that identifies the locality of the specimen collected near New Orleans.

== Species ==
Thryothorus used to be considered the largest genus in the family Troglodytidae, with 27 species, but molecular phylogenetic studies revealed that it represented a polyphyletic assemblage of at least four independent clades now recognized at generic level, with the other 26 species split off in the genera Cantorchilus, Pheugopedius, and Thryophilus. The Carolina wren is now the only species within this genus; DNA work suggests it is most closely allied to Bewick's wren Thryomanes bewickii.

=== Subspecies ===
Ten subspecies of the Carolina wren are currently recognized:

- T. l. ludovicianus (Latham, 1790) – southeast Canada (southern Ontario, irregularly in eastern and southern Quebec) and the eastern United States (southern Wisconsin and New England southward to Texas and northern Florida)
- T. l. miamensis (Ridgway, 1875) – "Florida wren"; Florida peninsula from approximately 30°N (Gainesville) region southward through the rest of the state
- T. l. nesophilus (Stevenson, 1973) – "Dog Island wren"; Dog Island in northwestern Florida
- T. l. burleighi (Lowery, 1940) – "Burleigh's Carolina wren"; islands off of the Mississippi coast, on Cat Island, Ship Island, and Horn Island
- T. l. lomitensis (Sennett, 1890) – "Lomita wren"; southern Texas (lower Rio Grande Valley) to the extreme northeast of Mexico (Tamaulipas)
- T. l. oberholseri Lowery, 1940 – southwestern Texas (south-central USA) and northern Mexico
- T. l. berlandieri (S. F. Baird, 1858) – "Berlandier's wren"; tropical northeastern Mexico (eastern Coahuila, Nuevo León, and southwestern Tamaulipas)
- T. l. tropicalis Lowery & Newman, 1949 – northeastern Mexico (eastern San Luis Potosí and southern Tamaulipas)
- T. l. albinucha (Cabot, 1847) – southeastern Mexico (Yucatán Peninsula) to northern Guatemala (Petén)
- T. l. subfulvus Miller & Griscom, 1925 – arid interior of Guatemala to northwestern Nicaragua

The last two subspecies above, forming a disjunct population in the Yucatán Peninsula of Mexico, Belize, Nicaragua, and in Guatemala, are sometimes treated as a separate species, either known as Cabot's wren or white-browed wren (Thryothorus albinucha). They are included in T. ludovicianus by most authors, however.

Relationships of the Carolina wren to selected other wrens:

- - - - Campylorhynchus megalopterus
      - Campylorhynchus brunneicapillus
    - - Thryomanes bewicki
      - - Thryothorus ludovicianus ludovicianus
        - T. l. albinucha
  - - - Cinnycerthia peruana
      - - Thryothorus guarayanus
        - Thryothorus leucotis
    - - - - - - Henicorhina leucosticta
              - Henicorhina leucophrys
            - Uropsila leucogastra
          - Cyphorhinus arada
        - - Thryothorus maculipectus
          - Thryothorus coraya
      - Thryothorus sinaloa

== Description ==
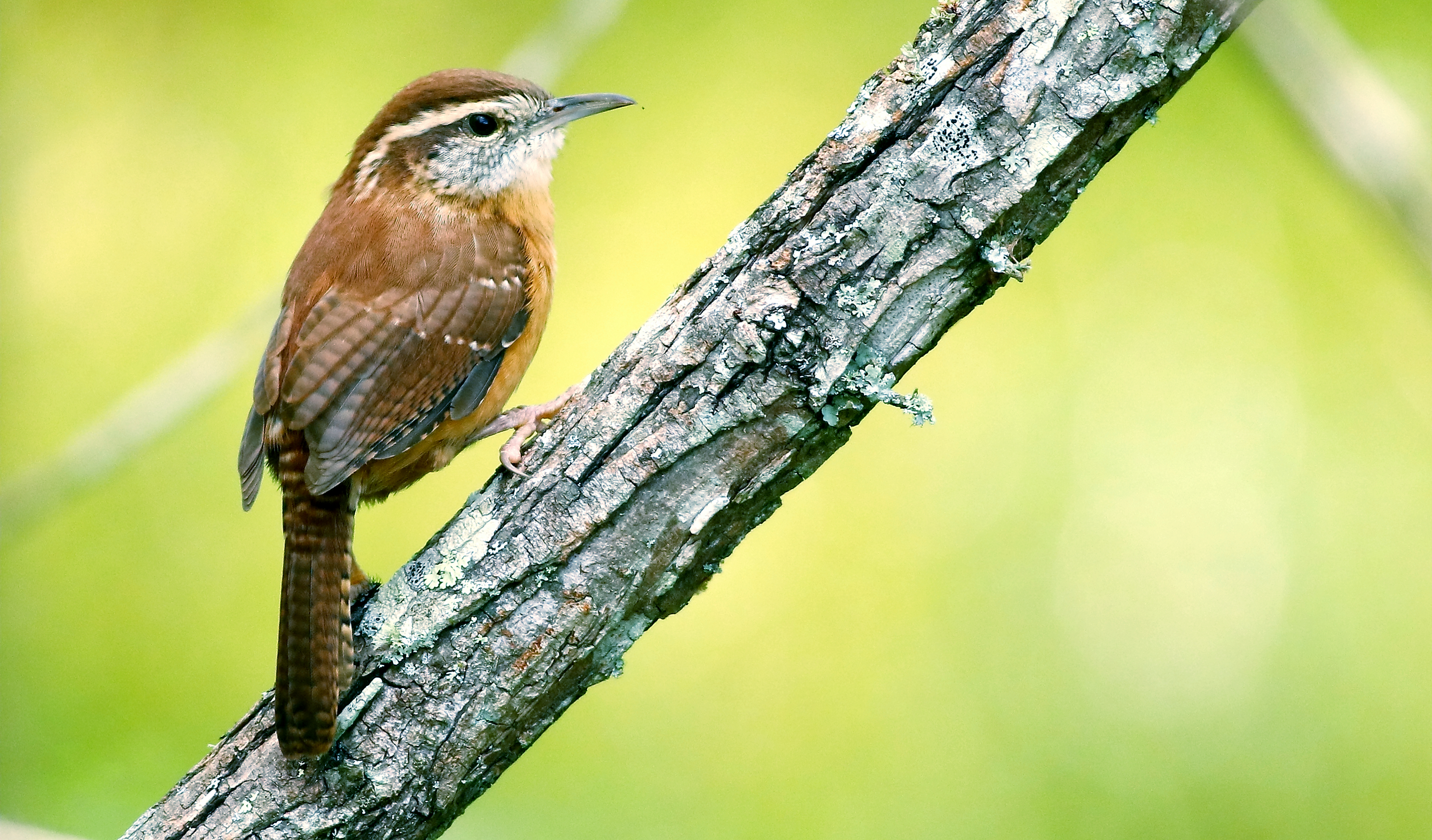
Carolina wren in Greenville, South Carolina

At 12.5 to 14 cm (4.9 to 5.5 in) long, with a 29 cm (11 in) wingspan and a weight of about 18 to 23 g (0.63 to 0.81 oz), the Carolina wren is a fairly large wren; the second largest in the United States species after the cactus wren. Among standard measurements, the wing chord is 5.4 to 6.4 cm (2.1 to 2.5 in), the tail is 4.5 to 5.6 cm (1.8 to 2.2 in), the culmen is 1.4 to 1.8 cm (0.55 to 0.71 in) and the tarsus is 2 to 2.3 cm (0.79 to 0.91 in). Sexual dimorphism is slight with males being larger than their mates. A study indicated that of 42 mated pairs, every male but one was larger than the female of the pair. The males were on average 11 percent heavier along with having longer wing chords.

For T. l. ludovicianus, the crown is rich brown that appears more chestnut-colored on its rump and upper tail coverts. Shoulders and greater coverts are a rich brown, with a series of small white dots on the lesser primary coverts. The secondary coverts are rich brown with a darker brown barring on both webs; the bars on the primaries are on the outerwebs only, but darker and more noticeable. The rectrices are brown with 18 to 20 bars that span across the tail. The white supercilious streak borders thinly with a black above and below, and extends above and beyond its shoulders. The ear coverts are speckled gray and grayish-black. Its chin and throat are grey that becomes buff on its chest, flank and belly, though the latter two are of a warmer color. The underwing coverts sport a grayish buff color. Its iris is reddish-brown, the upper mandible is dark gray to pinkish-gray, paler at the base and on the lower mandible. The legs are light pinkish to yellowish-brown color.

Several differences are seen among the subspecies. In contrast to T. l. ludovicianus, T. l. berlandieri is of a slightly smaller build, but possesses a larger bill, the upperparts are duller brown with deeper colored underparts, T. l. lomitensis is of a duller color (than either T. l. ludovicianus or T. l. berlandieri) with its underparts either pale or almost white, T. l. miamensis contains darker rusty chestnut upperparts and deeper colored below. T. l. burleighi is duller and sootier with less distinct tail markings, T. l. mesophilus has paler underparts and a whiter supercilium, and T. l. tropicalis is darker than all races, and contains heavier bars than T. l. berlandieri.

=== Plumage ===
Juvenile T. l. ludovicianus is similar in appearance to the adult, but the plumage is generally paler; a softer texture, buff-tipped wing coverts, and a paler superciliary streak. In August and September, the partial plumage molt for the post-juvenile wrens is darker in color and affects the contour plumage, wing coverts, tail and develops a whiter superciliary stripe. The post-nuptial molt for adults in the same time period is more pronounced in color than the spring molt, with both sexes similar in appearance.

=== Life span ===
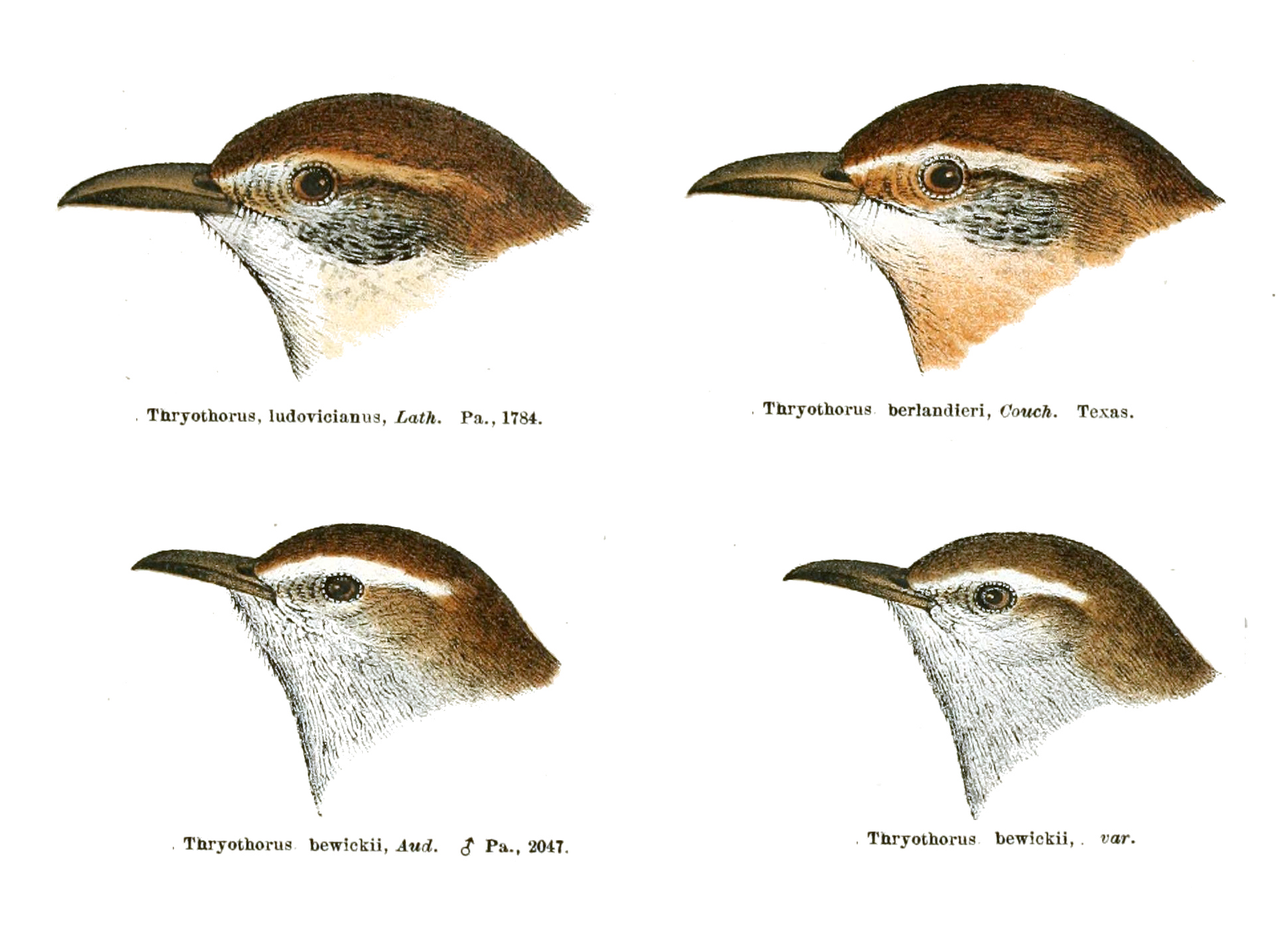
Sketches of Thryothorus ludovicianus, T. l. lomitensis, and Thryomanes bewickii (Bewick's wren) and one of its subspecies

Survival rates differ by region. A male captured in Arkansas lived to be at least 6 years and 1 month old, and in Alabama, the oldest female and male captured were six and ten years old, respectively. In a survival probability mark-and-recapture study conducted within the southeastern United States from 1992 to 2003, roughly 90 percent of the banded wrens died within 10 years.

=== Similar species ===
The easiest species to confuse with the Carolina wren is Bewick's wren, which differs in being smaller but with a longer tail, grayer-brown above and whiter below. The Carolina and white-browed wrens differ from the northern house wren in being larger, with a much more obvious supercilium, a decidedly longer bill and hind toe; and the culmen has a notch behind the tip.

== Habitat and distribution ==
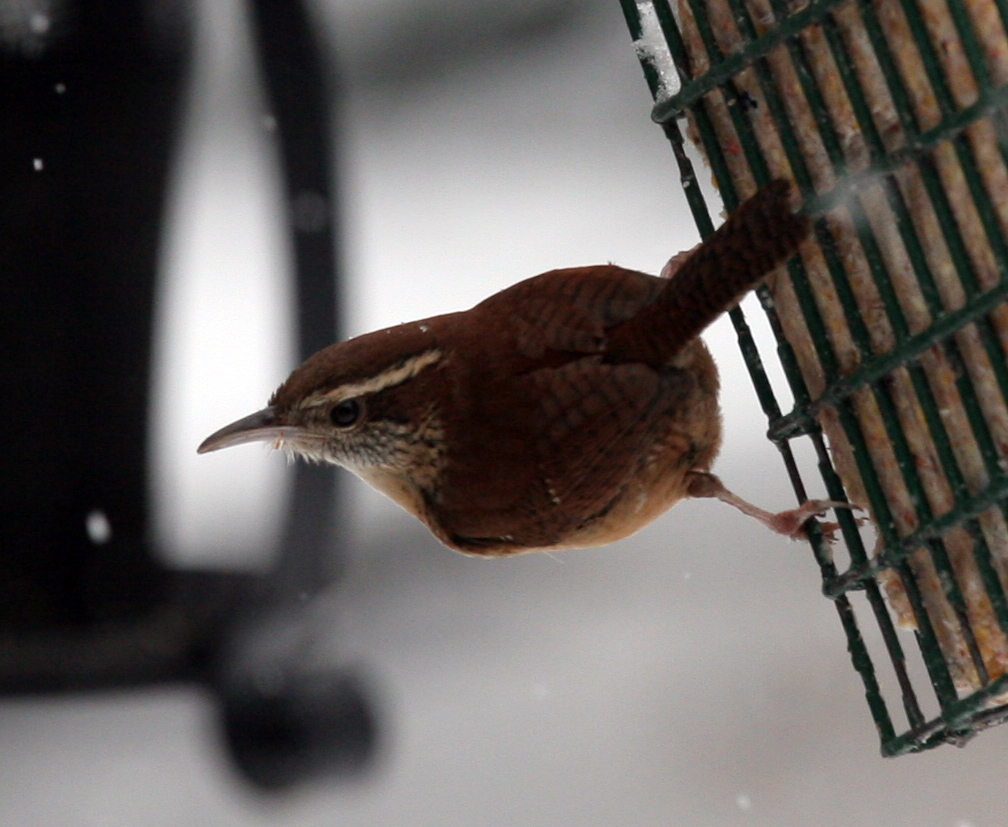
Carolina wren at feeder

These birds are largely resident, and will only disperse beyond their range after mild winters. Carolina wrens sporadically breed as far north as Maine and Quebec after mild winters. In certain parts of their range, such as most of Iowa, prolonged periods of snow can curtail potential expansion. Permanent breeding locations range from eastern Nebraska, southern Michigan, southeast Ontario and the New England states to Mexican states such as Coahuila, Nuevo León, San Luis Potosí and Tamaulipas and the Gulf Coast of the United States. Local occurrences with infrequent and likely breeding locations include southeast South Dakota, central Kansas, eastern Colorado, western Oklahoma and Texas as far as Maine and New Brunswick. There have been occasional vagrants spotted in Colorado, New Mexico, and Arizona, Wyoming, South Dakota, Manitoba, Nova Scotia, and the Gulf of St. Lawrence.

The range of the wrens increased northward and westward in several regions over the past few centuries. In Massachusetts, the wrens had expanded westward and northeastward from its former southeastern location in approximately 35 years, in New York the population increased three-fold in roughly 25 years, while in the midwest states of Ohio and Michigan, numbers have increased since the mid-1800s and early 1900s, respectively. Expansion around Ontario occurred since early reports in 1890 and 1905. Explanations given include infrequent winter storms in the 20th century, expanded forest habitats, and the wrens taking advantage of urban areas containing feeders, especially in winter. From 1966 to 2015 the Carolina wren experienced a greater than 1.5% annual population increase throughout most of its northern range, extending from southern Maine to southern Nebraska.

Carolina wrens adapt to various habitats. Natural habitats include various types of woodland such as oak hardwoods and mixed oak-pine woodlands, ash and elmwoods, hickory-oak woodlands with a healthy amount of tangled undergrowth. The preferred habitats are riparian forest, brushy edges, swamps, overgrown farmland, and suburban yards with abundant thick shrubs and trees, and parks. It has an affinity for dilapidated buildings and unkempt yards in man-made areas. Subspecies T. l. burleighi and T. l. neophilus inhabit slash pine and palmettos.

== Behavior ==
=== Song and calls ===
Singing of Carolina wren (Thryothorus ludovicianus)

Carolina Wren, Wilkes County, NC.

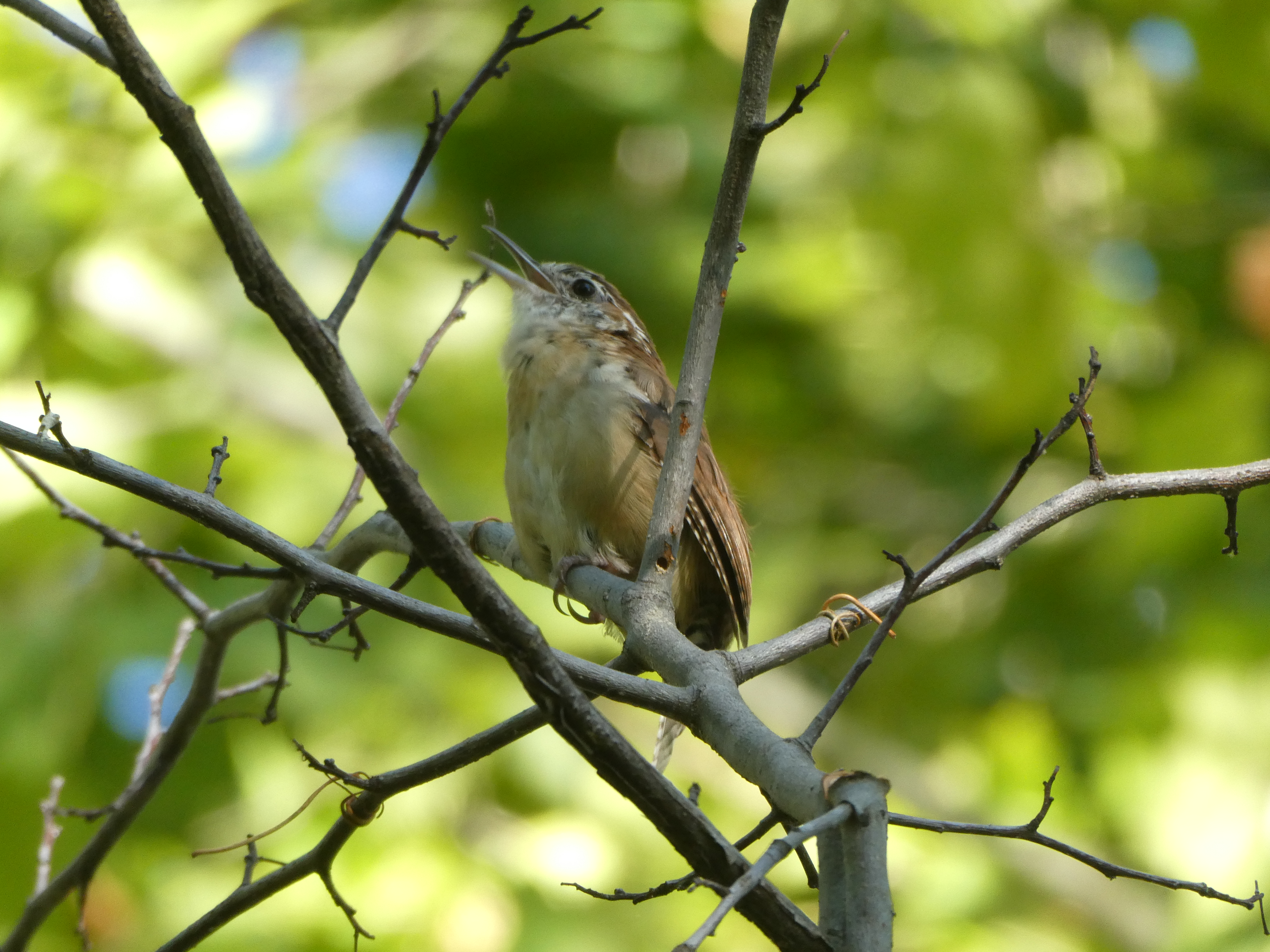
A Carolina Wren singing in Forest Park.

Carolina wrens sing year round and at any point during the daytime, except during the most harsh weather conditions. Males alone sing, and have a repertoire of at least twenty different phrase patterns and on average, thirty two. One of these patterns is repeated for several minutes, and although the male's song can be repeated up to twelve times, the general number of songs ranges from three to five times in repetition. While singing, the tail of the birds is pointed downward. Some general vocalizations have been transcribed as teakettle-teakettle-teakettle and cheery-cheery-cheery. Various descriptions of the teakettle song include whee-udel, whee-udel, whee-udel, che-wortel, che-wortel and túrtee-túrtee-túrtee and familiar names and phrases such as sweet heart, sweet heart, come to me, come to me, sweet William, and Richelieu, Richelieu.

Males are capable of increasing their repertoire through song learning, but due to their sedentary nature and territorial defense habits, the song learning must occur within the first three months of life. Geographic barriers affect song repertoire size from male wrens, as one study indicated that distances separated as close as 3 kilometers (1.9 mi) by water barriers can have the same effect as that of a distance of 145 kilometers (90 mi) in the mainland with no barriers.

Female Carolina wrens possess song control regions that would appear to make them capable of singing with repertoires like the male. Due to vocalizations that they occasionally make with the male, it has been suggested that song perception plays a role and is of behavioral relevance.

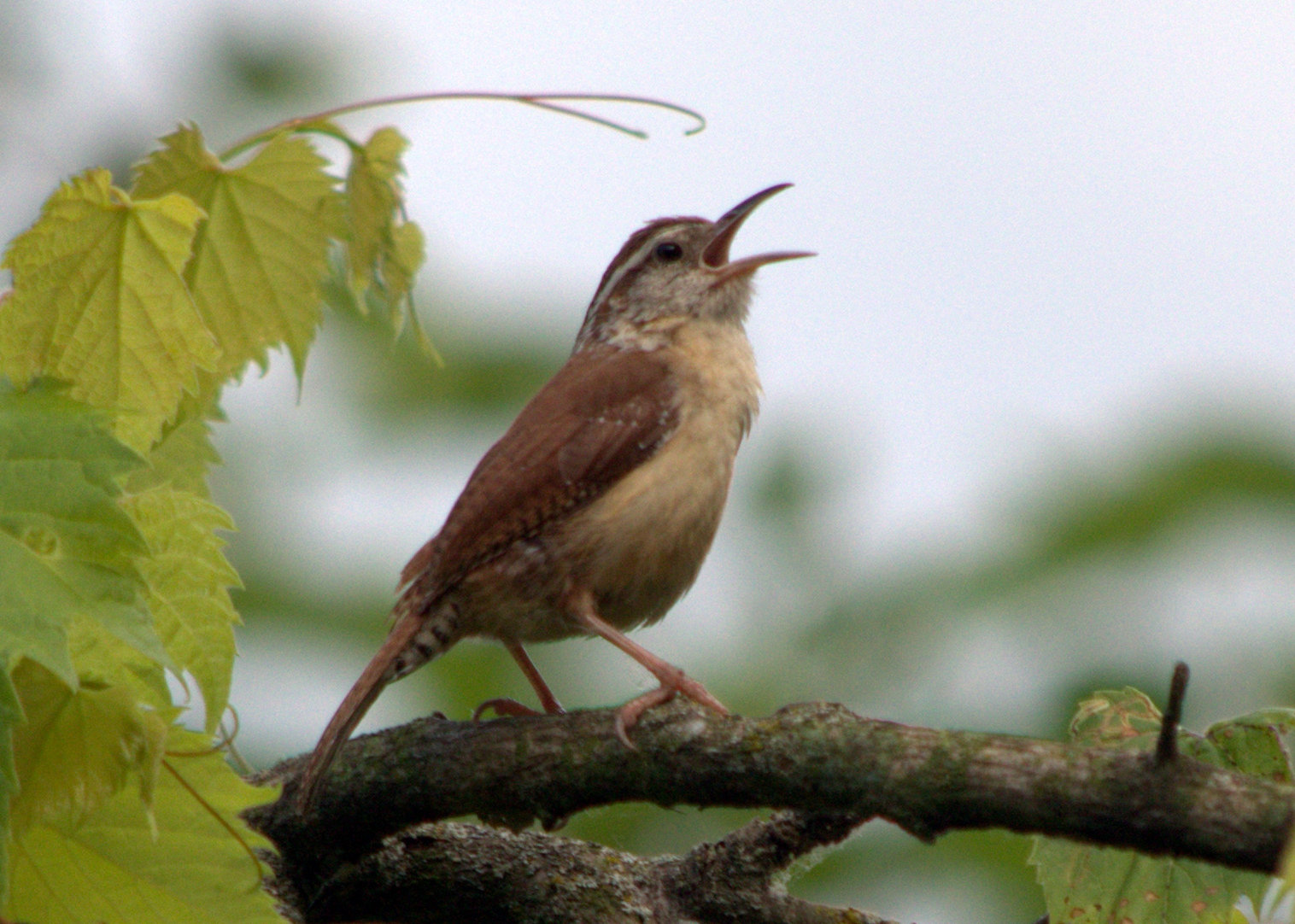
Carolina wren on Rutland Township Forest Preserve

Different subspecies have variations in songs and calls, such as miamensis having a more rapid song that contains more notes than the races that are further north.

Their songs can be confused with the Kentucky warbler. The song patterns are similar, but the warbler's songs are described as richer, with more ringing and a hurried pace. Other bird species with songs described as akin to the wren are the northern flicker, Baltimore oriole, grey catbird, and more specifically the peto, peto, peto call of the tufted titmouse and the whistle of the northern cardinal. Occasionally, the wrens mimic other species; in Pennsylvania this trait has caused the bird to be also known as the 'mocking wren'.

=== Sexual selection ===
A 2006 study suggested that the correlation of tail length and body size in males, wing length in females, and lifespan for both sexes were signs of individual quality, and the wrens of high quality tend to mate with like individuals. The courting and antagonistic encounters that involve the tail fanning and wing drooping was suggested to be a possible signaling use. Age and life experience are not thought of as significant for potential mates due to their relatively short lifespan and sedentary lifestyle. Due to the large size of male wrens and the male's vigor in defending its territory, intrasexual selection was given as a possible explanation for the sexual dimorphism.

=== Territorial and predator defense ===
Both sexes are involved in defending the territory. One aspect of territorial defense involves identifying the proximity of the threat based on the loudness of bird song as well as the level of degradation of the calls. In experiments involving playback, the wrens are capable of discriminating between degraded and undegraded songs, as well as degraded songs in the same acoustic conditions, and can detect changes of acoustic properties within their territories, such as songs under foliage. Song degradation can also be used to determine the proximity of potential intruders. If the song of a bird appears to be degraded, the wrens will assume that the threat is distant and not respond; if the song is not degraded, they respond by attacking. Not all birds within their territory are potential enemies. Some species of birds that are neighbors are designated as dear enemies by the wrens, and the responses to neighbors and intruders in their territories differ by the season. In spring, the wrens respond more aggressively toward neighbors, though in the fall, no major discrepancy in responses is shown. When protecting their nest, alarm calls are the general response. The wrens judge the size of the potential threat, such as a blue jay and avoid the risk of injury when attacking. Countersinging produced by intruder birds is more likely to be taken as an aggressive threat to male Carolina wrens.

Both males and females utilize calls in alarm situations, especially in territorial disputes and encounters with predators. Males alone produce the cheer call, which can sound indistinct. In southern regions of their range, the sound males use in alarm disputes is a ringing pink or p'dink sound. Females are the only ones that can perform the paired dit-dit or chatter sounds. The former can be used in territorial disputes with predators, and with at least northern populations the songs are used in alternation with the males cheer chant. The chatter is used exclusively with territorial encounters with male song, and the song can either follow or overlap her mate's song.

=== Feeding ===
Carolina wrens spend the majority of their time on or near the ground searching for food, or in tangles of vegetation and vines. They also probe bark crevices on lower tree levels, or pick up leaf-litter in order to search for prey. Their diet consists of invertebrates, such as beetles, true bugs, grasshoppers, katydids, spiders, ants, bees, and wasps. Small lizards and tree frogs also make up the carnivorous portion of their diet. Vegetable matter, such as fruit pulp and various seeds, makes up a small percentage of their diet. In the northern portion of their range, they frequent bird feeders.

=== Movement ===
Carolina wrens are wary, and are more often heard than seen. When on the ground, they move in jerky hops pillaging through various objects, whether man-made or natural. While moving abruptly, they pause momentarily for chattering or singing. When stationary, they move in twitched motions, jerking their breast around. They also sun- or sand-bathe. The wrens also displays a skittish behavior when encountered by humans, thrusting off into cover slowly if approaching is detected. However, they occasionally seek out humans that are near, so long as there is no movement from them. Other movements include crawling like a creeper and hanging upside-down like a nuthatch.

Flights are generally of short duration, rapid, low-leveled, and wavelike. The wings during flight are flapped rapidly, and are frequently used during foraging. They are also capable of flying vertically from the base of a tree to the top in a single wing assisted bound.

=== Breeding ===
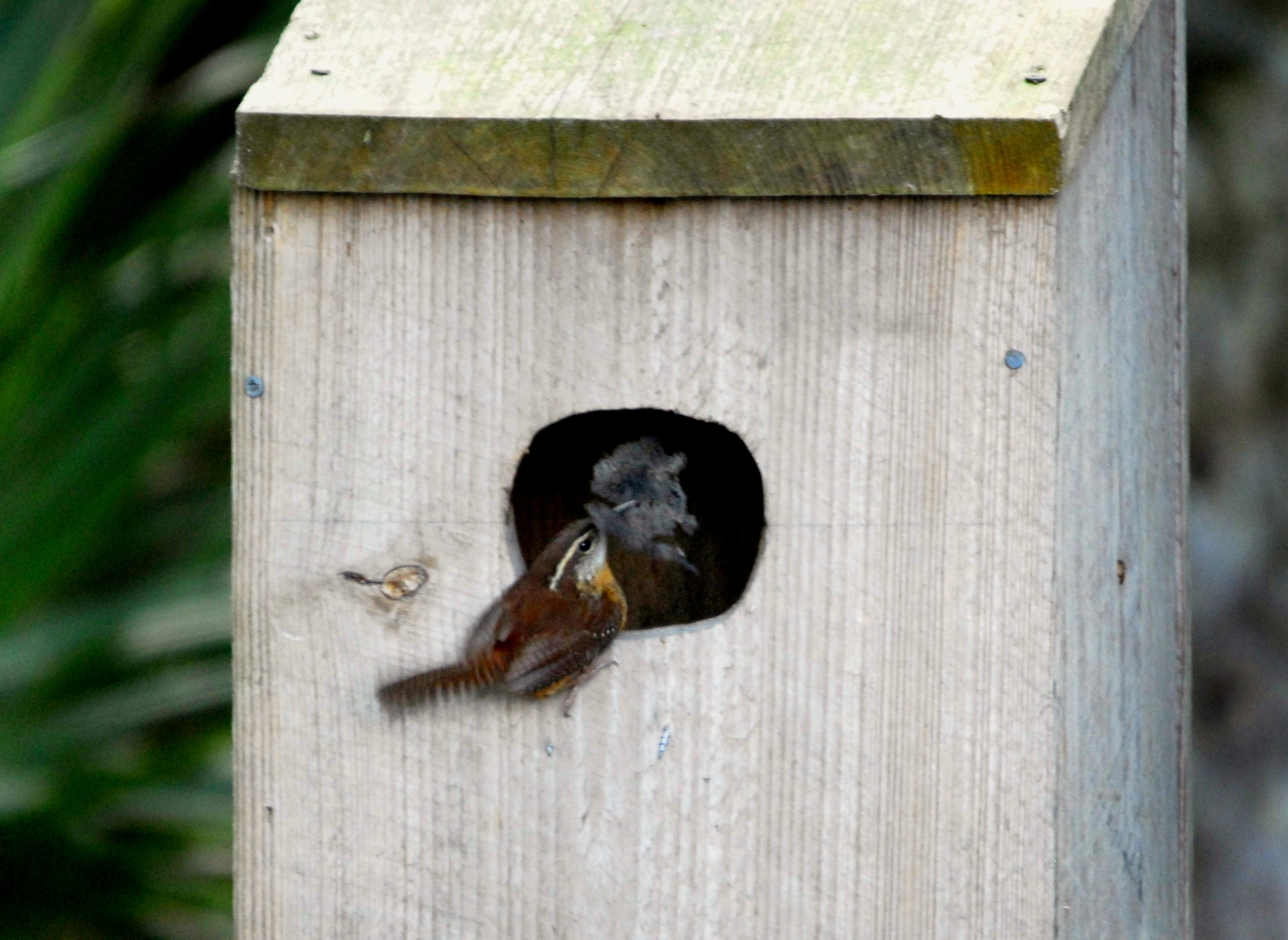
Carolina wren nesting in a duck nestbox

Carolina wrens are both genetically and socially monogamous and will usually mate for life. Mate changing is rare, and there has been one possible observation of polygamy. During the winter season, males are more responsible for guarding the territory. Females vary in succeeding to maintain winter territories without a mate. It has been suggested that the possibility of desertion and decline in care-taking from males along with the need for security in resources year-round prevent extra pair copulations from females, as the mortality rate for Carolina wrens peaks during the winter. Along with thermoregulatory benefits, roosting is thought to reinforce pair-bonding and prevent divorce between mates.

The nests are arch-shaped structures with a side entrance and built of dried plants or strips of bark, as well as horsehair, string, wool and snake sloughs. The male obtains nesting materials while the female remains at the site to construct the nest. Nests are located in fragmented or complete cavities in trees, or in man-made structures such as bird-boxes, buildings, tin cans, mailboxes or unorthodox places such as pockets of hanging jackets in sheds or in a tractor in everyday use. Nests are from 1–3 m (3.3–9.8 ft) from the ground and are rarely higher. They occasionally can be built in sloping locations or at ground level.

Egg laying dates and clutch size vary by region; in Texas the time period is from late February to late August, while in Iowa it ranges from late April to June. The clutch size is generally three to six eggs, but can reach as high as seven in Texas. The eggs are creamy white with brown or reddish-brown spots, and are more heavily marked at the broad end. They are incubated by the female for 12–16 days. After the young hatch, they are fed exclusively on invertebrates and fledge in 12–14 days. As many as three broods may be raised by a pair in a single breeding season. In one study, three of the 70 fledglings remained in or defended territory adjacent to the natal area.

Male and females are involved in the process of provisioning at similar rates throughout most nest stages, with the males providing slightly more in the nestling stages. Both sexes increase their provision rates as the nestlings grow in age.

== Predation and threats ==
Although Carolina wrens are fairly common, brood parasitism by the brown-headed cowbird is common, with up to 25% of Carolina wren nests being affected in certain regions such as Oklahoma and Alabama. Cowbird parasitism peaks in April at 41%, and is as low as 8% and 0% in July and August, respectively. Female cowbirds sometimes eject Carolina wren eggs before laying their own, and even if host eggs are retained, the size of cowbird eggs negatively affect the hatching success of wren eggs. As a result, cowbirds may have a significant impact on the reproductive success of wrens. The feeding rate for cowbird nestlings is higher than wren feeding rates, and some have been raised to independence. This also can be detrimental to the survival of wren nestlings. A rare instance of brood-parasitism by a house finch has been recorded. The rate of brood parasitism is thought to be lower in more natural and concealed nesting locations. Body parasites such as the larvae of blowflies feed on nestlings and the blood loss weakens nestlings. Fellow species of wren such as Bewick's wren and the winter wren compete for nesting locations and food, respectively.

In Virginia, some Carolina wren populations show high levels of mercury in their blood and this is acquired from feeding all-year-round on spiders. (Note: The North Folk Holston and South Rivers were used in the study and were both contaminated by industrial activity.) Spiders being at a higher trophic level contain a higher concentrations of mercury (through biomagnification) than herbivorous invertebrates. As these wrens are year-round residents, they are at a higher risk than other species to acquire mercury in their blood. Nest abandonment and failure to raise young are more common with higher mercury content. Exposure, and prolonged periods of cold, ice, and snow is thought to affect the wren nestling and adult populations, respectively. Wrens that outlast those winters reside in sheltered areas during the season.

Among the top predators of adult Carolina wrens are domestic cats, and snakes such as the timber rattlesnake. Raccoons and black rat snakes also feed on wren eggs and nestlings.

== In culture ==
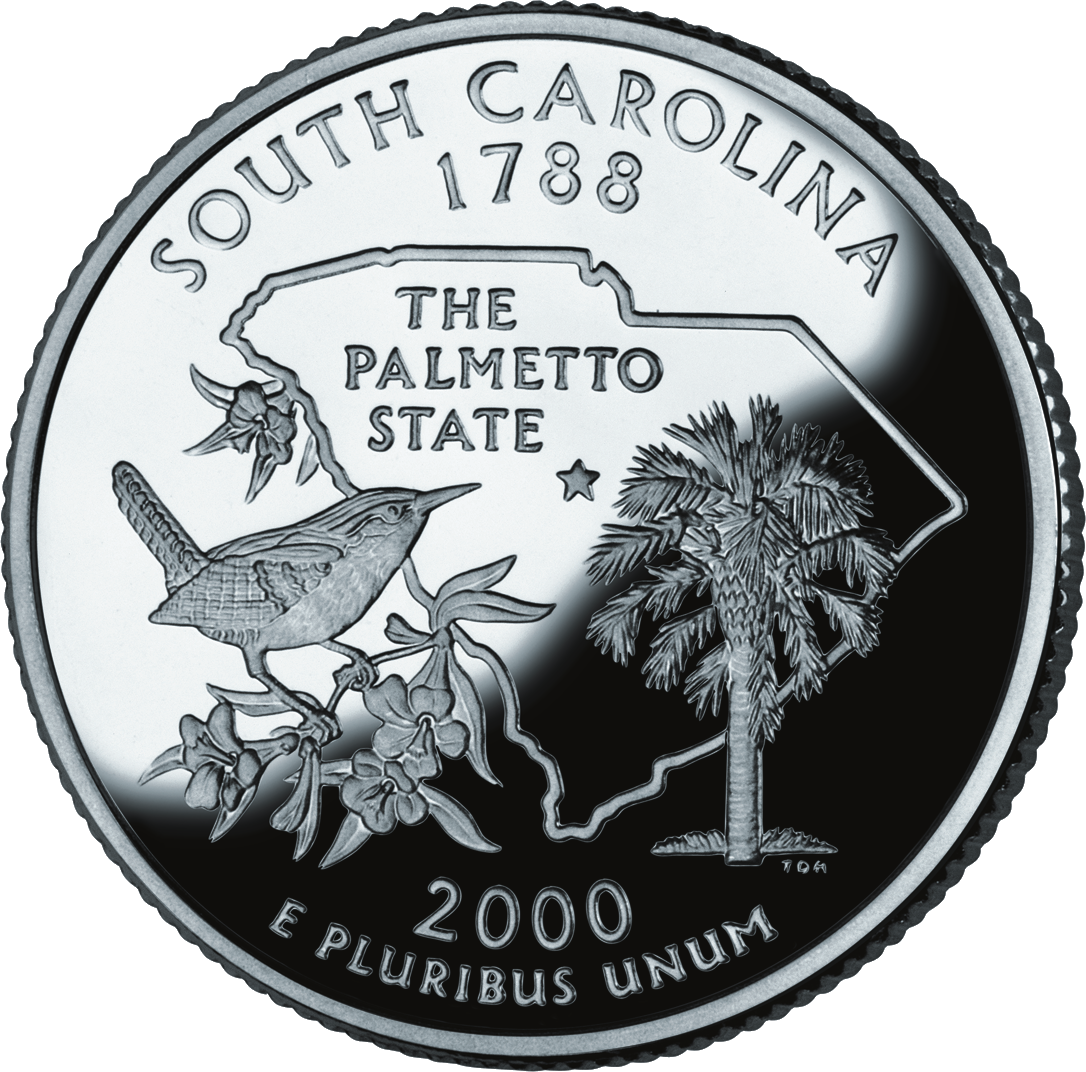
South Carolina state quarter

In 1930, the South Carolina Federated Women's club adopted the Carolina wren as the unofficial state bird over the eastern mourning dove and pushed for its official state adoption until 1939, when the South Carolina Legislature named the northern mockingbird as the state bird. In 1948, the legislature repealed their previous decision, and the wren became the official state bird.

In 2000, the Carolina wren was featured on the back of the South Carolina edition of the 50 State Quarters.
