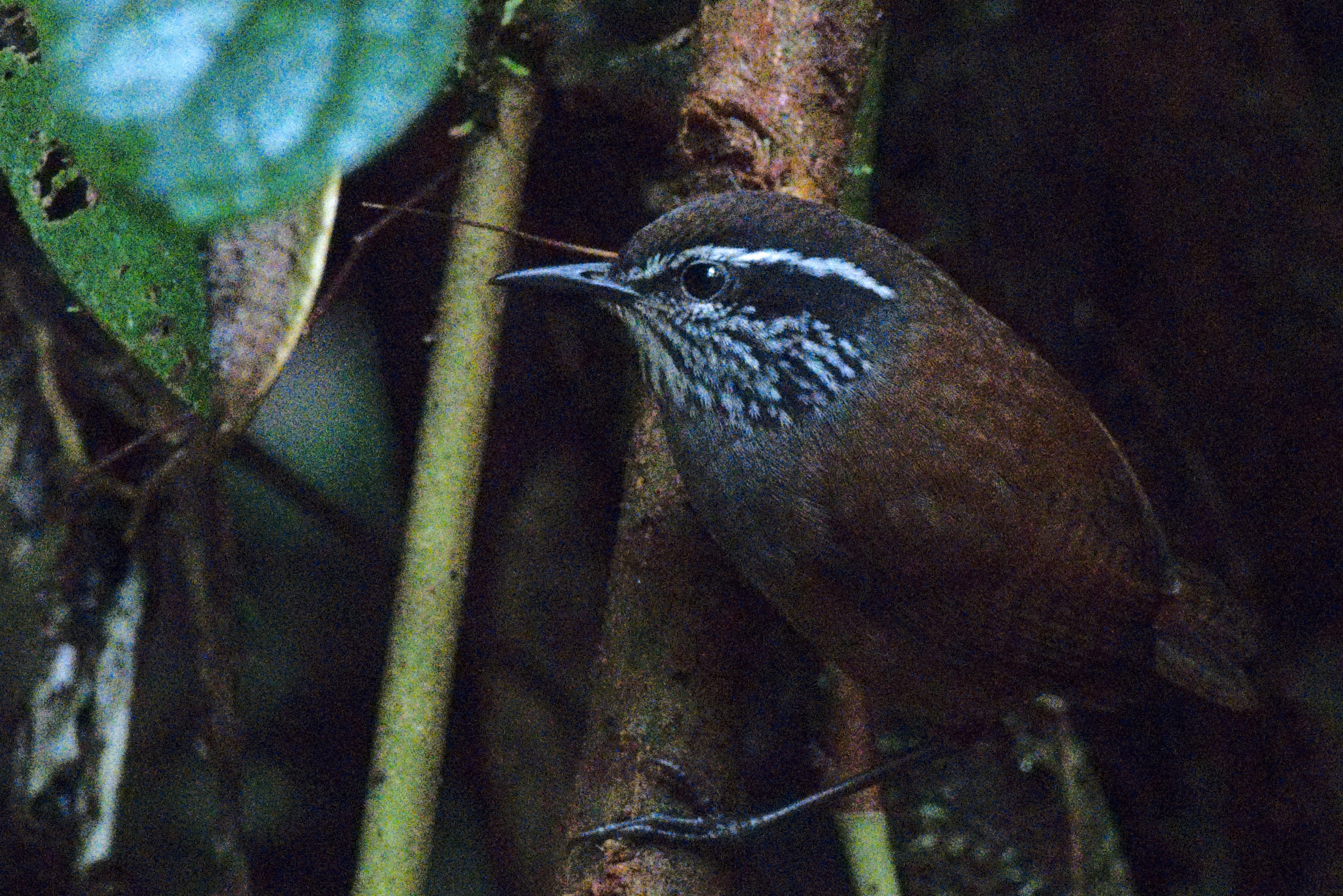

Conservation status
- Vulnerable (IUCN 3.1)

Scientific classification
- Kingdom: Animalia
- Phylum: Chordata
- Class: Aves
- Order: Passeriformes
- Family: Troglodytidae
- Genus: Henicorhina
- Species: H. negreti

Binomial name
- Henicorhina negreti Salaman, Coopmans, Donegan, Mulligan, Cortés, Hilty & Ortega, 2003

= Munchique wood wren =

Species of bird

The Munchique wood wren (Henicorhina negreti) is a member of the wren family (Troglodytidae) that was described as new to science in 2003. It is found in the Western Andes of Colombia.

== Taxonomy and systematics ==
The Munchique wood wren was first observed by Steven Hilty in the 1980s and not described until detailed studies by Paul Salaman, Paul Coopmans, Thomas Donegan, and others in 2000. Morphological and especially vocal differences set it apart from the widespread grey-breasted wood wren (Henicorhina leucophrys) that occurs at lower elevations on the same mountain slope. It is closely related to the grey-breasted wood wren and is probably derived from it. The species' scientific name honors Álvaro José Negret, a Colombian ornithologist who died in 1998. The Munchique wood wren is monotypic.

== Description ==
The Munchique wood wren is 10.8 to 11.7 cm (4.3 to 4.6 in) long and weighs 15.2 to 16.7 g (0.54 to 0.59 oz). The adult has a dark brown crown with blackish marks, a thin white supercilium, a dull black line from the lores through the eye, and blackish cheeks with whitish mottling. Its upperparts are a slightly brighter brown than the crown and its tail is brown with black bars. The throat is white, streaked with black at its lower edge. The breast is medium gray, the belly a lighter gray, and the flanks and vent area brown. The abdomen and flanks have dark gray to black bars. The juvenile is much darker than the adult and does not have the abdominal barring.

== Distribution and habitat ==
The Munchique wood wren is found on the Pacific slope of Colombia's Western Andes. It is known from only a few areas, the Munchique Massif in Cauca Department; in the region where the departments of Chocó, Antioquia, and Risaralda meet; in the area where extreme eastern Chocó and southwestern Antioquia meet; and a very small area in extreme southeastern Chocó.

The Munchiqe wood wren appears to have very specific habitat requirements. It inhabits very wet and stunted cloud forest, typically with many epiphytes, that is almost continuously in fog. In elevation it ranges from 2,250 to 2,640 m (7,380 to 8,660 ft).

== Behavior ==
=== Feeding ===
The Munchique wood wren forages low in vegetation, typically below 2 m (6.6 ft) above the ground but occasionally up to 4 m (13 ft). It may briefly associate with mixed-species foraging flocks that enter its territory but does not follow them. The stomach contents of specimens contained beetles, flies, and other arthropods.

=== Breeding ===
Based on the age of a collected juvenile, the Munchique wood wren lays its eggs in early June, but no other information about its breeding phenology has been published.

=== Vocalization ===
The Munchique wood wren's song is "phrases of 6–12 pure notes...[with a] typical song containing more than ten repeated phrases". Its calls are "mostly churrs, similar to those of congeners."

== Status ==
The IUCN has assessed the Munchique wood wren as Vulnerable; prior to 2018 it was considered Critically Endangered. Though its overall range spans 18,700 km^{2} (7,200 sq mi), the actual area of suitable habitat might be as small as 8 km^{2} (3.1 sq mi). It is found in national parks, but enforcement is lax and forest clearing and settlement occur in them. The estimated population number of up to 15,000 individuals might be too high by a factor of 10.
