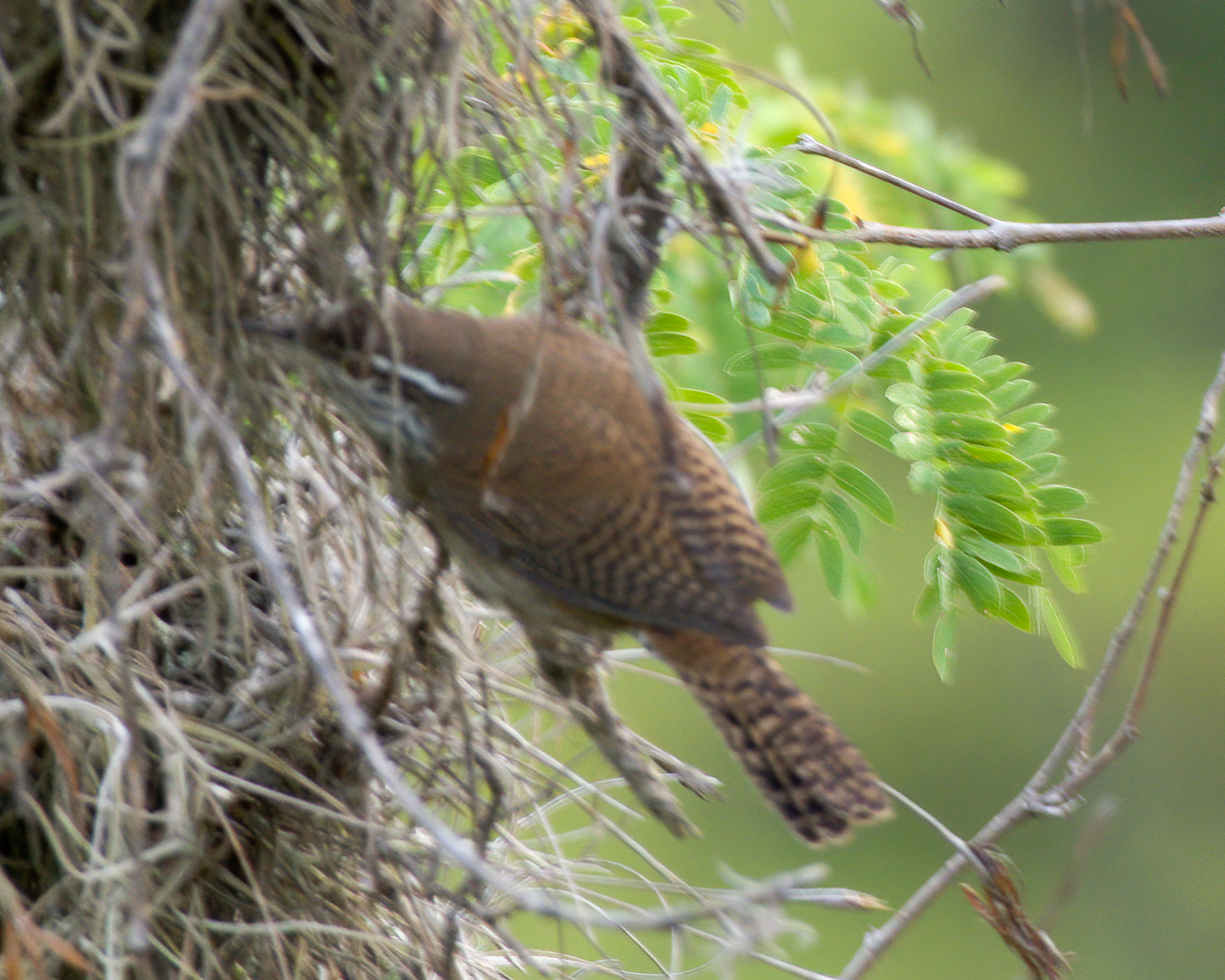

Conservation status
- Critically Endangered (IUCN 3.1)

Scientific classification
- Kingdom: Animalia
- Phylum: Chordata
- Class: Aves
- Order: Passeriformes
- Family: Troglodytidae
- Genus: Thryophilus
- Species: T. nicefori

Binomial name
- Thryophilus nicefori (Meyer de Schauensee, 1946)

Synonyms
- Thryothorus nicefori

= Niceforo's wren =

Species of bird

Niceforo's wren (Thryophilus nicefori) is a species of bird in the family Troglodytidae. It is endemic to Colombia.

Its natural habitat is subtropical or tropical high-altitude dry shrubland. It is threatened by habitat loss.

In Spanish the bird is known as Cucarachero de Nicéforo or Cucarachero del Chicamocha.

== Taxonomy ==
Niceforo's wren was first formally described in 1946 by the American ornithologist Rodolphe Meyer de Schauensee. The genus name derives from the Ancient Greek thruon - reed, and philos - loving. The species name commemorates Brother Nicéforo María, a Colombian missionary and herpetologist who provided Meyer de Schauensee with many specimens.

The type-locality site is San Gil on the río Fonce south of Bucaramanga, in Santander, where ten specimens were collected between 1944 and 1948.

Previously considered part of the genus Thryothorus and frequently treated as a subspecies of Rufous-and-white wren (Thryophilus rufalbus), Niceforo's wren is currently regarded as a full species. It is monotypic - there are no recognized subspecies.

== Description ==
A medium-sized wren, averaging 14.5–15 cm (5.7–5.9 in) in length. Adult birds are dull olive-grey on the head and mantle, becoming slightly more rufescent on the back. The wings are finely barred, with more broad barring on the tail. A long white supercilium is bordered behind the eye by fine black lines. The face is marked by black and white streaks. The underparts are white becoming greyish on the sides and flanks. The undertail coverts show broad black barring. Juvenile birds have not been described.

== Distribution and habitat ==
=== Distribution ===
Niceforo's wren is endemic to the valley of the Chicamocha River, as well as the Sogamoso, Suaréz, and Fonce river basins. These locations are within the departments of Boyacá and Santander, in the central northern part of Colombia.

After the first specimens of Niceforo's wren were collected during the 1940s, no further sightings were recorded until two birds were seen in that area in 1989 and 2000. This may reflect the fact that this area was difficult to visit from the 1950s onward due to guerilla activity.

In 2005 Oswaldo Cortes and colleagues discovered a disjunct population in the area of Soatá, approximately 100 km (62 mi) south of San Gill, and in 2004-06 Thomas M Donegan and colleagues discovered a population in the Serranía de los Yariguíes, about 50 km (31 mi) to the west of San Gill.

=== Habitat ===
This wren is found in dry forest at altitudes between 1,132 and 1,840 m (3,710 and 6,040 ft), in areas with abundant vegetation cover, a dense understory and abundant leaf litter. Its presence was found to be significantly correlated with that of Tricanthera gigantea, Acacia farnesiana, Sapindus saponaria and Pithecellobium dulce. A recent survey found populations of Niceforo's wren in riparian forest fragments with tangled vegetation composed by shrubs and thorn scrubs, and also along shaded edges of coffee and cacao plantations.

== Behaviour ==
=== Feeding ===
Niceforo's wren is a largely terrestrial species, being found mostly within 2.66 m (8 ft 9 in) of ground level. They appear to forage for food mainly in leaf litter on the ground and have also been observed gleaning for arthropods under dry leaves and pecking on branches and tree holes.

=== Breeding ===
It is a monogamous species. Pairs defend territories from 1 to 4 hectares (2.5 to 9.9 acres) along streams and rivers, and the maximum density has been calculated as one individual for every two hectares of habitat.

=== Nesting ===
Niceforo's wrens construct an elbow-shaped nest with an entrance at one side of the top and a globular base. These nests are located between 3 and 10 m (9.8 and 32.8 ft) above the ground, typically in trees of 12–16 m (39–52 ft) in height. Nesting materials included vegetable fibers of Tillandsia usneoides, fungal rhizomorphs (Marasmius spp.), plant twigs, and vines, forming a very dense structure. As has been observed in two other species of Thryophilus wrens as well as some other tropical bird species, Niceforo's wrens construct their nests near wasp colonies, a strategy that increases the rate of offspring survival as the wasps deter predators.

== Status ==
Niceforo's wren is listed as critically endangered on both the IUCN Red List and the Red Book of the Birds of Colombia. Surveys between 2004 and 2008 recorded 77 individuals. Based on these data the IUCN estimates the current global population is approximately 30-200 mature individuals. The surviving population is highly fragmented, with no single location holding more than 50 individuals.

The major threat to this species is habitat loss. All known populations face a progressive loss of habitat caused by the transformation of forests into croplands, pressure from goat farming (which destroys the dense understructure the species prefers), forest fires and the drying up of streams and rivers.

=== Conservation efforts ===
Project Chicamocha was established in 2003 under the Conservation Leadership Programme to support the conservation of two species endemic to the dry forest of the Chicamocha Valley: Niceforo's wren and the Chestnut-bellied hummingbird. This work led to the establishment in 2009 of the Niceforo's Wren Natural Bird Reserve in Zapatoca. Run by the Colombian NGO Fundación ProAves, the reserve comprises 1,400 ha (3,500 acres) of dry forest habitat, protecting a population of 21 individuals discovered in Santander Department in 2008. Another population of the wren is protected within the Serranía de los Yariguíes National Nature Park.

The project also led to the consolidation of the Alliance Chicamocha for the conservation of biodiversity of the Chicamocha Canyon, made up of government entities, NGOs, the local community, research institutes and universities.

In the municipality of Soatá in Boyacá, the organization OCOTEA, the ornithology group of the Francisco José de Caldas District University, and the Fundación Ecodiversidad have worked towards the conservation of and research on Niceforo's wren. In this town there is strong support for conservation of biodiversity, including the founding of the first community reserve in the Chicamocha Canyon.
