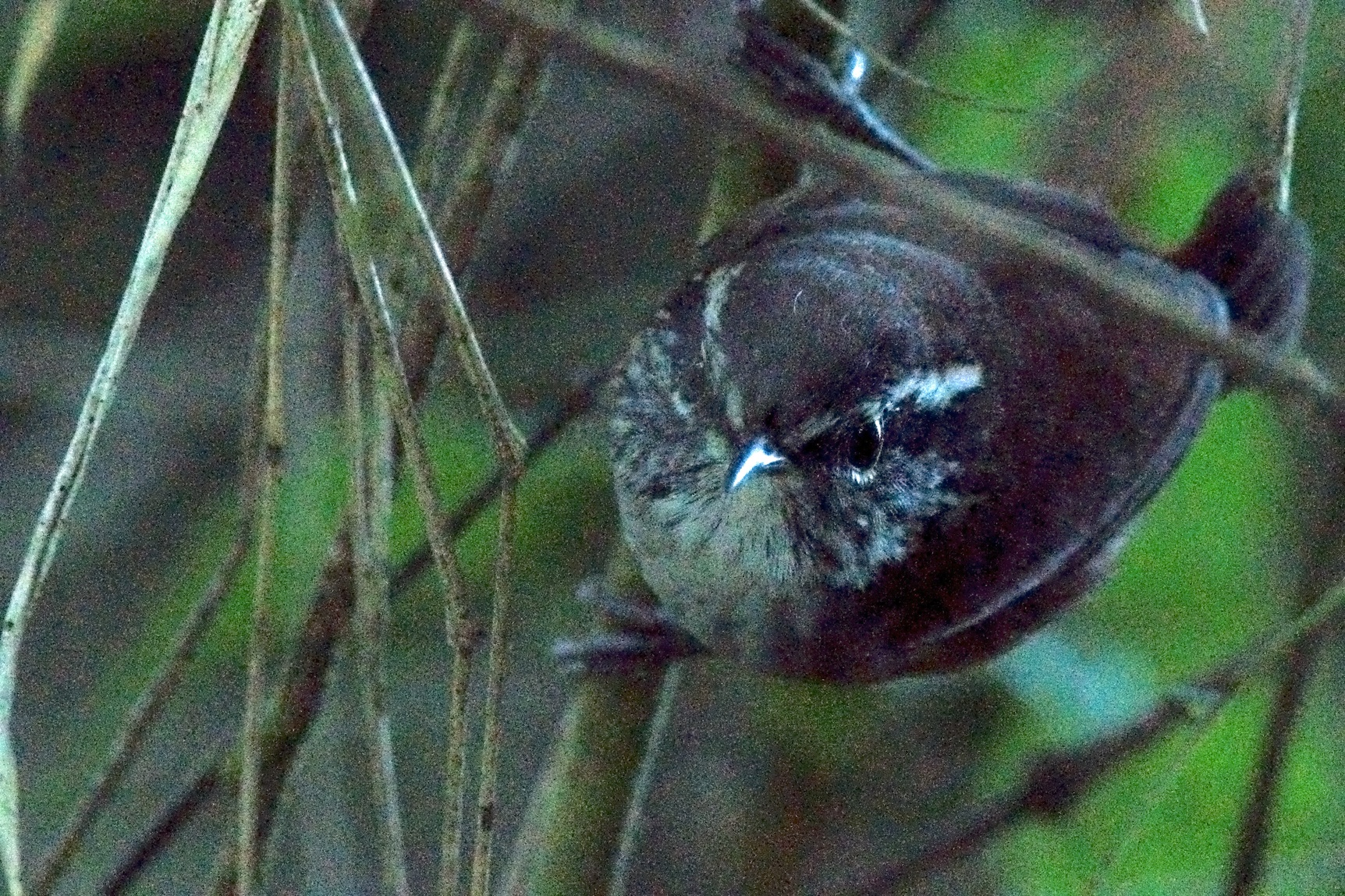

Conservation status
- Near Threatened (IUCN 3.1)

Scientific classification
- Kingdom: Animalia
- Phylum: Chordata
- Class: Aves
- Order: Passeriformes
- Family: Troglodytidae
- Genus: Henicorhina
- Species: H. anachoreta

Binomial name
- Henicorhina anachoreta Bangs, 1899

= Hermit wood wren =

Species of bird

The hermit wood wren or Santa Marta wood wren (Henicorhina anachoreta) is a species of bird in the family Troglodytidae. It is endemic to the Sierra Nevada de Santa Marta of northern Colombia.

== Taxonomy and systematics ==
The hermit wood wren was first described in 1899 as a subspecies of grey-breasted wood wren (Henicorhina leucophrys). In June 2016 the South American Classification Committee of the American Ornithological Society (SACC/AOS) elevated it to species rank and the International Ornithological Committee (IOC) and the Clements taxonomy followed suit. The parties adopted the name "hermit wood wren" to avoid confusion with the Santa Marta wren (Troglodytes monticola). It has no subspecies.

== Description ==
The hermit wood wren is approximately 10 to 11 cm (3.9 to 4.3 in) long. Its crown and nape are olive-brown and its upperparts a sooty or rusty brown. Its throat is whitish gray with indistinct streaks, its breast a medium gray, and its flanks are russet.

== Distribution and habitat ==
The hermit wood wren is found only in the Sierra Nevada de Santa Marta, an isolated mountain range in northern Colombia. It inhabits humid montane forest between approximately 2,000 and 4,000 m (6,600 and 13,100 ft) of elevation.

== Behavior ==
=== Feeding ===
As far as is known, the hermit wood wren's feeding behavior and diet are generally like those of H. leucophrys. It forages singly or in small groups from the ground to only as high as 2 m (6.6 ft) in vegetation. Its diet appears to be solely invertebrates. However, it has not been recorded following army ant swarms.

=== Breeding ===
No information about the hermit wood wren's breeding phenology has been published.

=== Vocalization ===
The hermit wood wren's song "differs significantly from [that of] H. l. bangsi in being characterized by a higher frequency and a greater frequency range". (H. l. bangsi is the subspecies of grey-breasted wood wren that is found in lower elevations of the Sierra Nevada de Santa Marta.) Like the grey-breasted wood wren, it is "far more easily heard than seen."

== Status ==
The IUCN has assessed the hermit wood wren as Near Threatened. It has a restricted range and though its population has not been quantified, it is believed to be decreasing. It does tolerate a degree of habitat disturbance and occurs in some protected areas.
