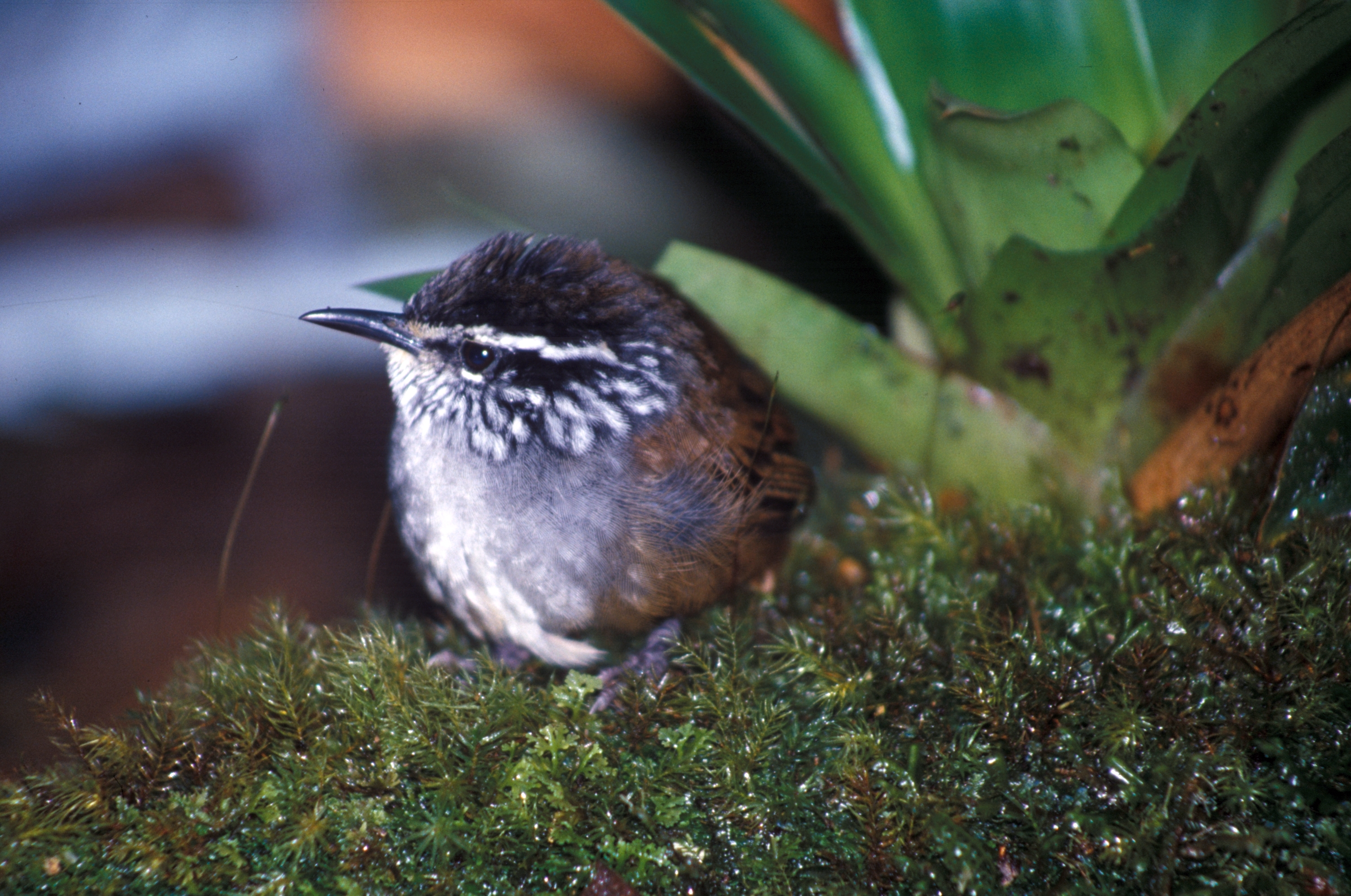
- Grey-breasted wood wren (Henicorhina leucophrys)

Scientific classification
- Kingdom: Animalia
- Phylum: Chordata
- Class: Aves
- Order: Passeriformes
- Family: Troglodytidae
- Genus: Henicorhina; P. L. Sclater & Salvin, 1868

Type species
- Scytalopus prostheleucus P.L. Sclater, 1957

Species
- Henicorhina leucophrys; Henicorhina leucoptera; Henicorhina leucosticta; Henicorhina anachoreta; Henicorhina negreti

= Henicorhina =

Wood wrens

Genus of birds

Henicorhina is the wood wren genus; these are birds in the family Troglodytidae. It contains the following species:

- Bar-winged wood wren, Henicorhina leucoptera
- Grey-breasted wood wren, Henicorhina leucophrys
- Hermit wood wren, Henicorhina anachoreta
- White-breasted wood wren, Henicorhina leucosticta
- Munchique wood wren, Henicorhina negreti

These species live in South and Central America.
