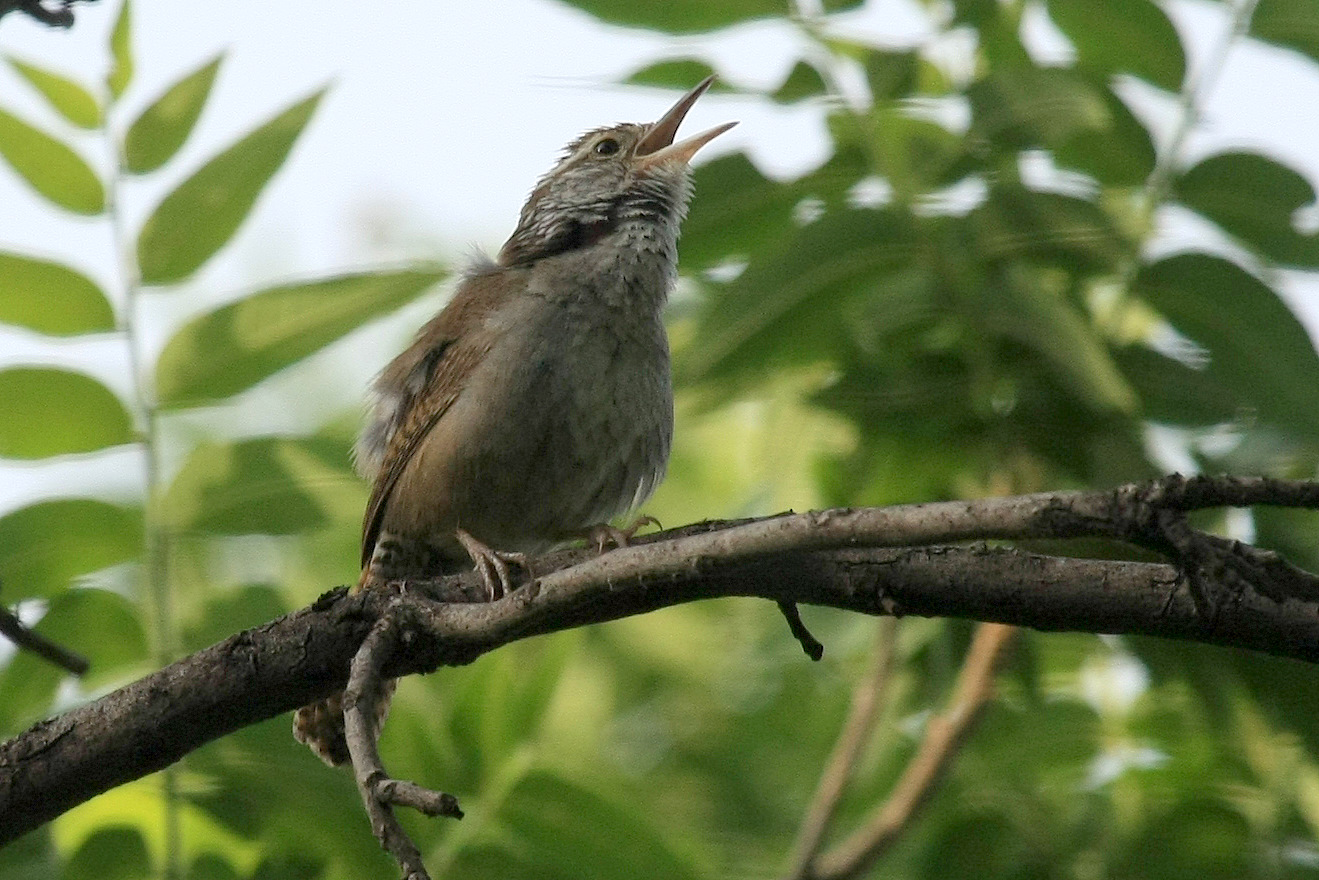
- Sinaloa wren (Thryophilus sinaloa)

Scientific classification
- Kingdom: Animalia
- Phylum: Chordata
- Class: Aves
- Order: Passeriformes
- Family: Troglodytidae
- Genus: Thryophilus; Baird, 1864

Type species
- Thryothorus rufalbus Lafresnaye, 1845

Species
- see text

= Thryophilus =

Genus of birds

Thryophilus is a genus of wrens in the family Troglodytidae. Members of the genus are found in Central and South America. The species were previously placed in genus Thryothorus.

== Taxonomy ==
A 2006 molecular phylogenetic study by Nigel Mann and coworkers found that the genus Thryothorus, as then constituted, was paraphyletic. The authors proposed splitting Thryothorus into four genera and resurrecting Pheugopedius and Thryophilus as well as introducing a new genus Cantorchilus. The rearrangement left only a single species, the Carolina wren remaining in the genus Thryothorus. The genus Thryophilus had been introduced in 1864 by the American naturalist Spencer Baird with Thryothorus rufalbus Lafresnaye, 1845, the rufous-and-white wren, as the type species. The genus name combines the Ancient Greek θρυον/thruon meaning "reed" with φιλος/"philos" meaning "lover".

== Species ==
The following five species are recognized by the International Ornithological Congress:

- Banded wren, Thryophilus pleurostictus – north South America
- Rufous-and-white wren, Thryophilus rufalbus – Mexico to Colombia and Venezuela
- Antioquia wren, Thryophilus sernai – northwest Colombia
- Niceforo's wren, Thryophilus nicefori – central north Colombia
- Sinaloa wren, Thryophilus sinaloa – Mexico
