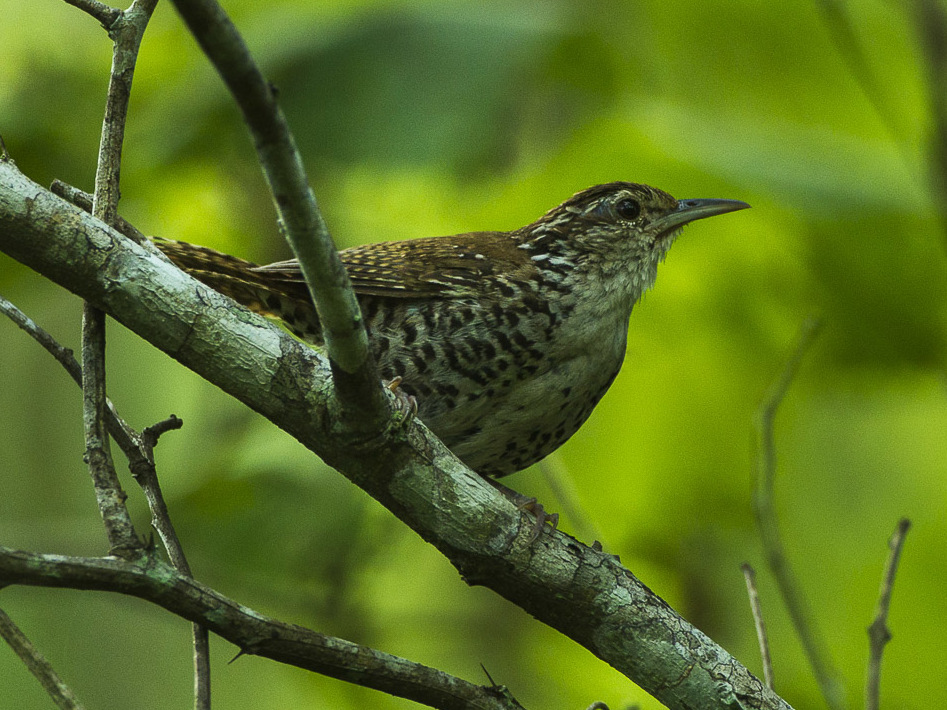
- In Chiapas, Mexico

Conservation status
- Least Concern (IUCN 3.1)

Scientific classification
- Kingdom: Animalia
- Phylum: Chordata
- Class: Aves
- Order: Passeriformes
- Family: Troglodytidae
- Genus: Thryophilus
- Species: T. pleurostictus

Binomial name
- Thryophilus pleurostictus (PL Sclater, 1860)

Synonyms
- Thryothorus pleurostictus; Pheugopedius pleurostictus

= Banded wren =

Species of bird

The banded wren (Thryophilus pleurostictus) is a small songbird of the wren family. It is a resident breeding species from central Mexico to Costa Rica. It was formerly placed in the genus Thryothorus (Mann et al., 2006).

This wren breeds in lowlands and foothills from sea level up to 800 m altitude in open or scrubby woodland, including forest clearings and second growth. It mainly occurs on the Pacific side of the central mountain ranges. Its flask-shaped nest has a long entrance tube angled downward and is lined with fine grasses. It is constructed 1–2.5 m high in a fork of a thorny tree or shrub, often close to a wasp nest. The female alone incubates the three or four unspotted white or pale greenish-blue eggs for about two weeks to hatching, and the young fledge in about the same length of time again.

The adult banded wren is 13.5 cm long and weighs 20 g. It has chestnut brown upperparts, strong white supercilia, a brown stripe through the eye and black streaking on the white cheeks. The underparts are white with much black barring on the lower belly and flanks. The wings and tail are barred with black. Young birds have duller upperparts and dull white underparts, faintly mottled with dusky brown.

The call of this species is a nasal cherrrt or a rattle and roll, kert rrruk kert rrruk, and the melodious and complex song is a mix of clear whistles and musical trills.

The banded wren forages actively in low vegetation or sometimes on the ground in pairs or family groups. It eats mainly eats insects, spiders and other invertebrates.
