= Álvaro José Negret =

Colombian ornithologist

Álvaro José Negret (1949 – July 18, 1998) was a Colombian scientist and author specializing in ornithology and conservation. Negret as a boy collected birds for the Natural History Museum of the University of Cauca in Popayán. As an undergraduate Negret co-founded the Natural History Museum at the University of Caldas before completing a Master's degree in Ecology and Management of Natural Resources at the University of Brasília in Brazil. Upon his return to Colombia Negret became a professor at the University of Cauca and Director of its Natural History Museum from 1987–98. He was married to geologist Patricia Torres.

As a conservationist, Negret helped found and manage the Tambito Nature Reserve which contains over 300 bird species. He also worked in coordination with Conservation International to design the Naya Corridor Program and unify two national parks (Farallones de Cali and Munchique), creating a massive conservation zone for protection of wildlife. At the time of his death he was working on a book about Colombia's endangered bird species entitled Aves Colombianas Amenazadas de Extinción (Engl. Threatened Birds of Colombia).

== Legacy ==
The HERB Project (Hydrology Ecology and Regional Biodiversity) in Colombia, described as "a collaborative programme between the Department of Geography, King's College London, UK, the Universidad del Cauca, the Instituto de Investigacion de Recursos Biologicos, Alexander Von Humboldt of the Colombian Ministry of Environment, CIAT and a number of other research groups in Colombia," is dedicated to the memory of Álvaro José Negret and continues his work on conservation.

The Munchique wood wren (henicorhina negreti) is named in Álvaro José Negret's honor. Negret is also honored in the 2011 book, Tropical Montane Cloud Forests: Science for Conservation and Management, for allowing research at Tambito. The University of Cauca has named its Botanical Garden after him.

His son Pablo Jose Negret, has followed his footsteps doing research in ecology and conservation of tropical forest.
