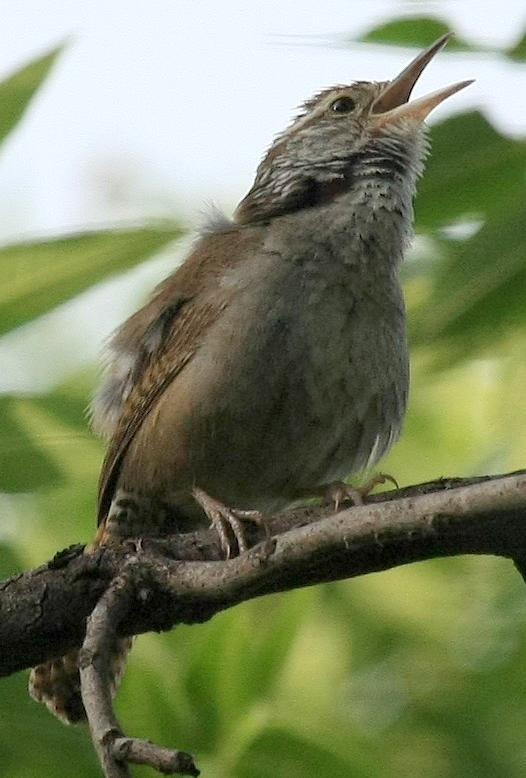

Conservation status
- Least Concern (IUCN 3.1)

Scientific classification
- Kingdom: Animalia
- Phylum: Chordata
- Class: Aves
- Order: Passeriformes
- Family: Troglodytidae
- Genus: Thryophilus
- Species: T. sinaloa

Binomial name
- Thryophilus sinaloa Baird, 1864

Synonyms
- Thryothorus sinaloa

= Sinaloa wren =

Species of bird

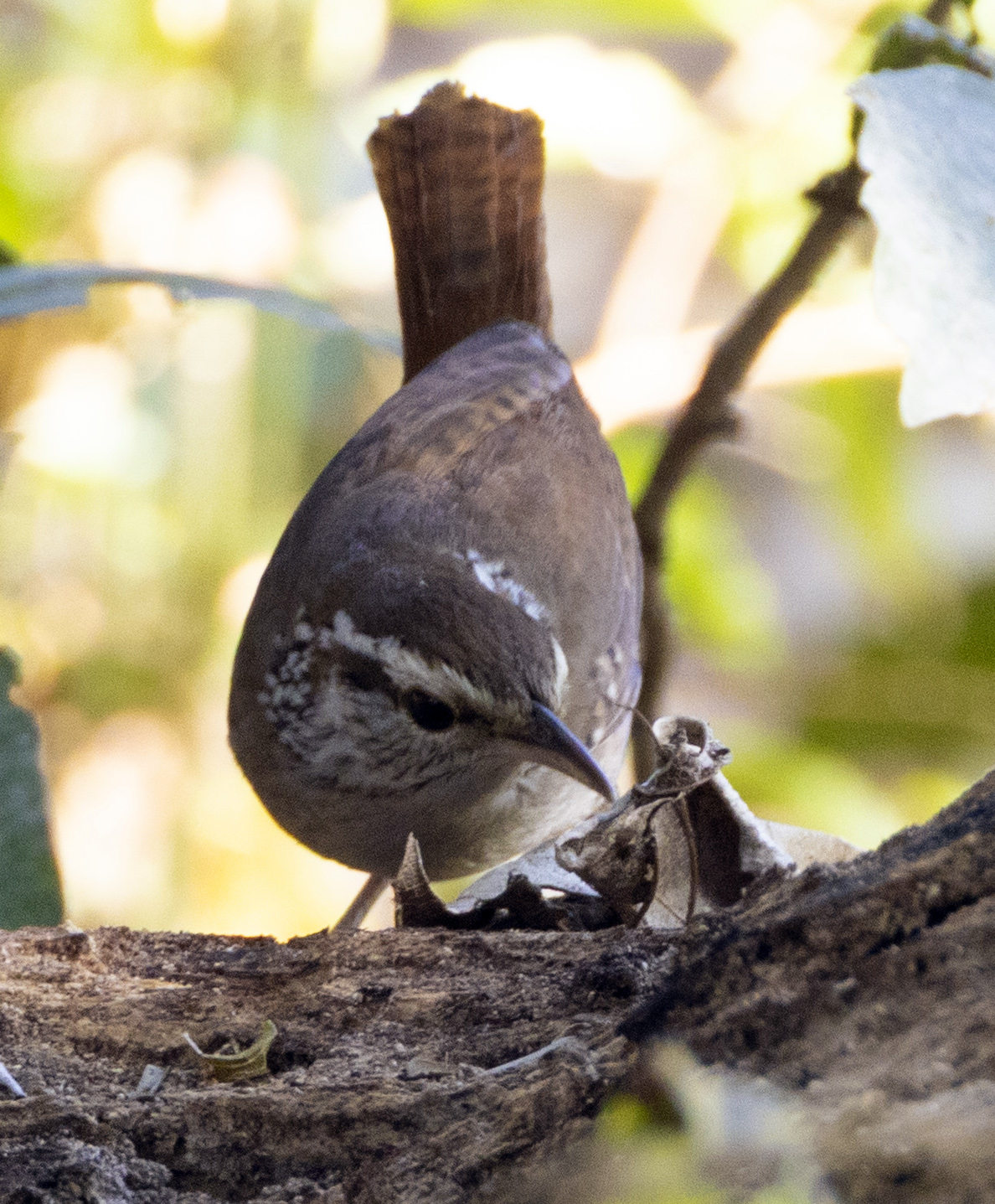
El Tuito, Jalisco, Mexico

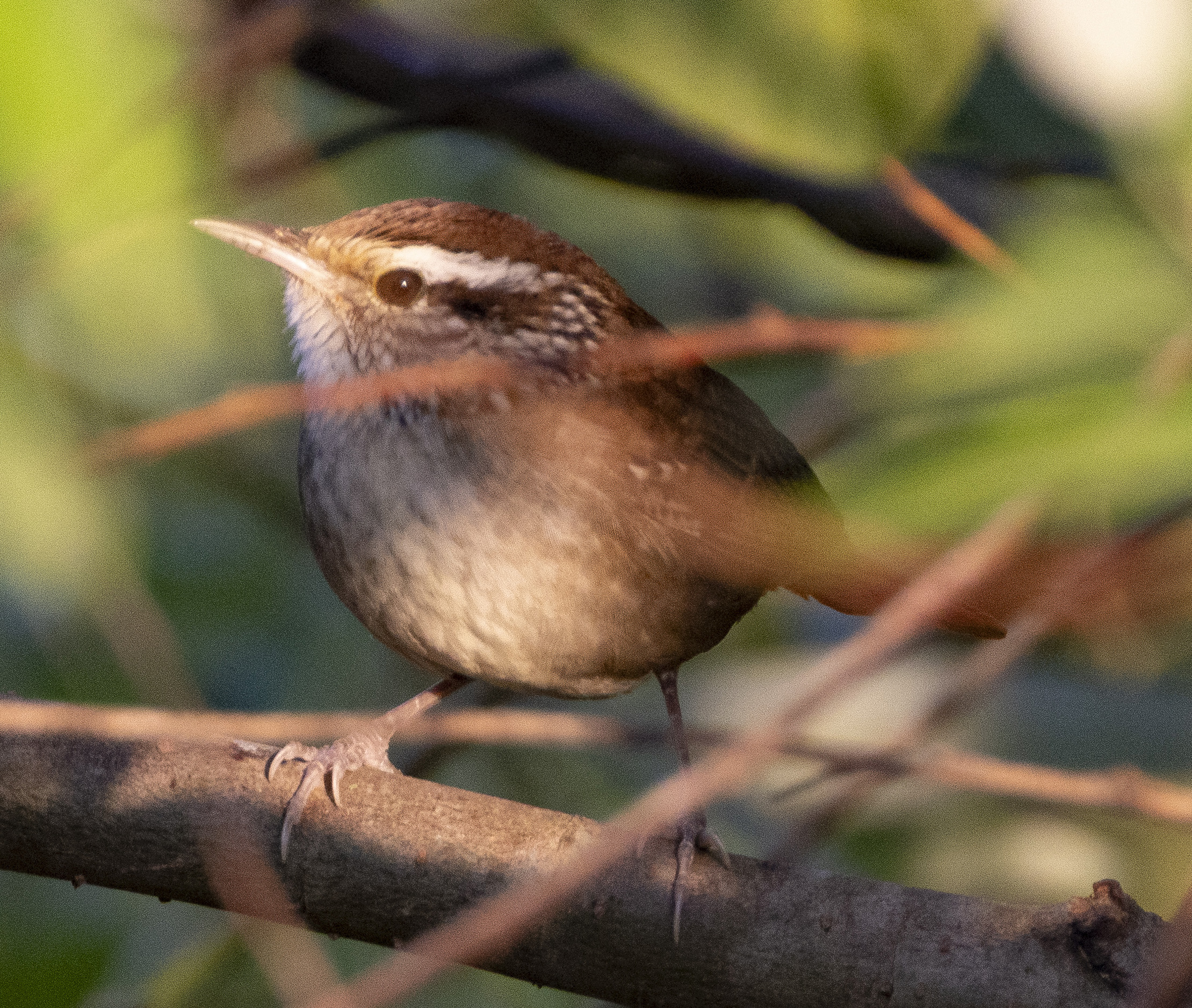
El Tuito, Jalisco, Mexico

The Sinaloa wren (Thryophilus sinaloa) is a species of bird in the family Troglodytidae. It is endemic to Mexico, with almost annual sightings in the United States, in Arizona.

== Taxonomy and systematics ==
The Sinaloa wren has three subspecies, the nominate Thryophilus sinaloa sinaloa, T. s. cinereus, and T. s. russeus.

== Description ==
The Sinaloa wren is 11.8 to 14 cm (4.6 to 5.5 in) long and weighs 10.9 to 19.8 g (0.38 to 0.70 oz). The nominate adults have dull brown upperparts that become more rufescent on the rump. The tail is rufous brown with black or dusky bars. They have a white to buffy white supercilium, a black streak behind the eye, and dusky-striped white cheeks. The sides of the neck have broad black and white streaks. The throat and breast are white darkening to pale brown on the flanks. Juveniles are similar but their flanks are paler and more cinnamon and the facial markings less distinct. The adult T. s. cinereus is paler and grayer than the nominate. T. s. russeus' upperparts are a deep russet brown.

== Distribution and habitat ==
The Sinaloa wren is endemic to Mexico though individuals are seen almost annually in southern Arizona. T. s. cinereus is the northernmost subspecies; it is found from northeastern Sonora south to northern Sinaloa and western Chihuahua and as a visitor to Arizona. T. s. sinaloa is found from central Sinaloa and western Durango south to Michoacán. T. s. russeus is found from central Guerrero east to western Oaxaca. The species inhabits the understory of deciduous forest and its edges, both undisturbed and second growth. It also occurs in plantations.

== Behavior ==
=== Feeding ===
Though no specifics have been published, the Sinaloa wren is known to be insectivorous. It forages mostly near the ground but occasionally as high as 10 m (33 ft) above it. It is assumed to capture its prey mostly by gleaning.

=== Breeding ===
The Sinaloa wren breeds between April and July, after the rainy season. The nest's shape has been likened to a flask; it is draped over a slender branch with the body on one side and the tunnel entrance on the other. The principal material is grass. It is often placed near colonies of aggressive ants or wasps. The clutch size is four or five.

=== Vocalization ===
The Sinaloa wren has a complex song. It has variously been described as "loud and variable...composed of rich phrases" and "clear gurgling whistles...with a rapid series of short trills" . Calls include "a rough buzzy rasp" and "a hard, dry chatter" .

== Status ==
The IUCN has assessed the Sinaloa wren as being of Least Concern. Its population is estimated to exceed 500,000 individuals. "Sinaloa wren can occupy scrub and second growth, and so is perhaps less vulnerable than are some other species of [the tropical deciduous forest]."
