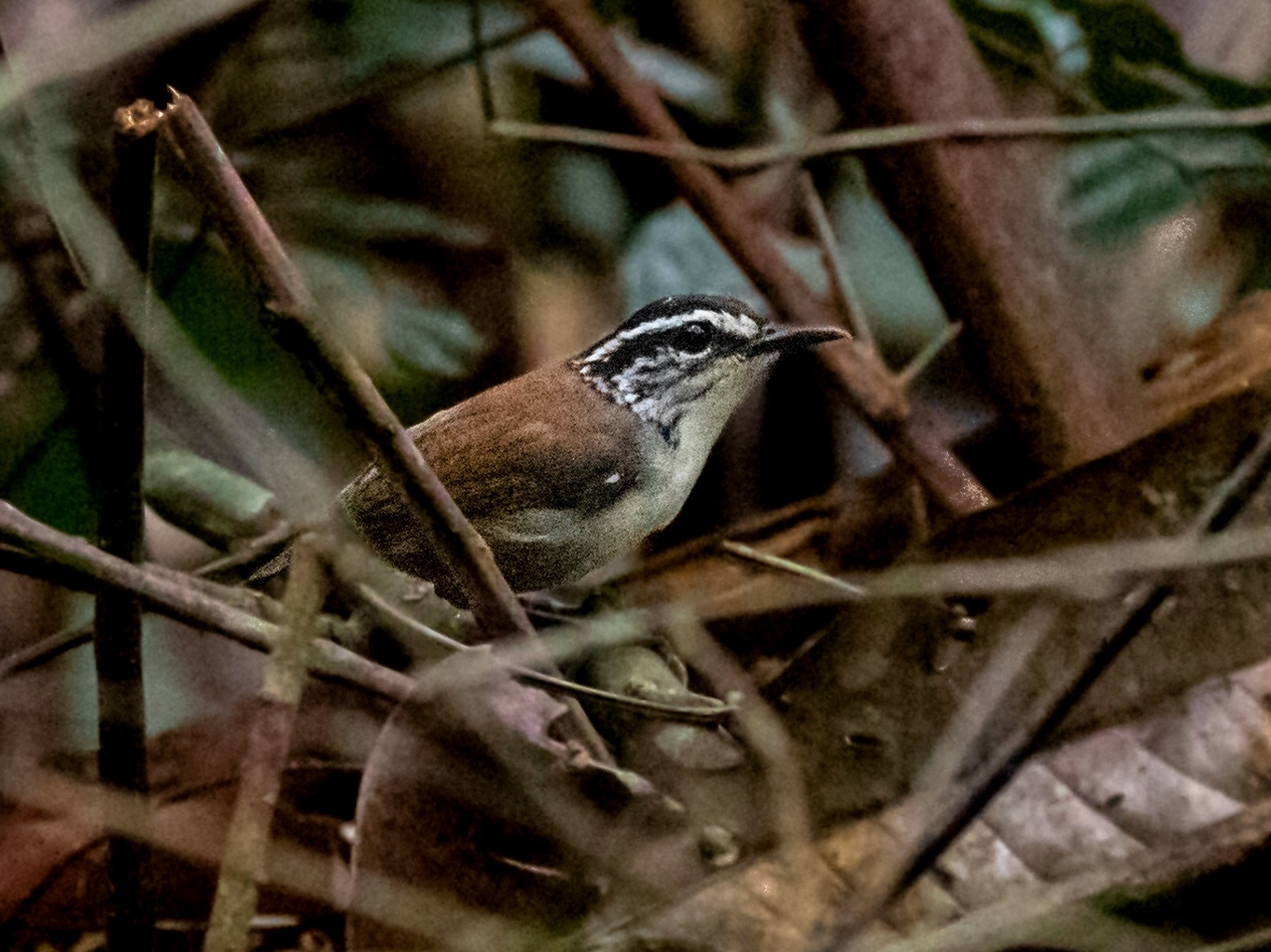
- In Presidente Figueiredo, Amazonas, Brazil.

Conservation status
- Least Concern (IUCN 3.1)

Scientific classification
- Kingdom: Animalia
- Phylum: Chordata
- Class: Aves
- Order: Passeriformes
- Family: Troglodytidae
- Genus: Henicorhina
- Species: H. leucosticta

Binomial name
- Henicorhina leucosticta (Cabanis, 1847)

= White-breasted wood wren =

Species of bird

The white-breasted wood wren (Henicorhina leucosticta) is a small songbird of the wren family. It is a resident breeding species from central Mexico to northeastern Peru and Suriname.

== Description ==
The adult white-breasted wood wren is 10 centimetres (3.9 in) long and weighs 16 grams (0.56 oz). It has chestnut brown upperparts with a darker crown, pale supercilia, and black-and-white streaked sides of the head and neck. The underparts are white becoming buff on the lower belly. The wings and very short tail are barred with black. Young birds have duller upperparts and grey underparts.

== Call ==
The opening bars of Symphony No. 5 by Ludwig van Beethoven, reminiscent of the white-breasted wood wren's song.

The call of this species is a sharp cheek or explosive tuck, and the song is cheer oweet oweet cheery weather; ornithologist and bioacoustics expert Luis Baptista of the California Academy of Sciences compared it to the opening bars of Beethoven's Fifth Symphony.

As with some other wrens, pairs often sing in duets.

== Habitat ==
H. leucosticta breeds in lowlands and foothills up to 1,850 metres (6,070 ft) above sea level in tropical wet forest and adjacent tall second growth. Its neat roofed nest is constructed on the ground or occasionally very low in undergrowth, and is concealed by dense vegetation. The eggs are incubated by the female alone for about two weeks to hatching, and the young fledge in about the same length of time again. This species may build a "dormitory nest" for individuals or family groups, which is typically higher, than the breeding nest, up to 3 metres (9.8 ft) off the ground.

The white-breasted wood wren forages actively in low vegetation or on the ground in pairs in family groups. It mainly eats insects and other invertebrates
