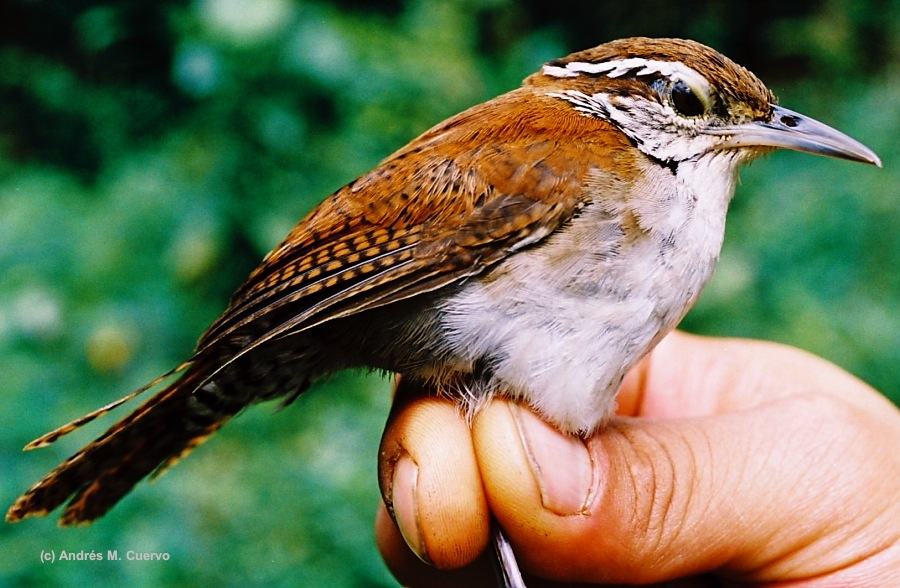

Conservation status
- Least Concern (IUCN 3.1)

Scientific classification
- Kingdom: Animalia
- Phylum: Chordata
- Class: Aves
- Order: Passeriformes
- Family: Troglodytidae
- Genus: Thryophilus
- Species: T. rufalbus

Binomial name
- Thryophilus rufalbus (Lafresnaye, 1845)

Synonyms
- Thryothorus rufalbus

= Rufous-and-white wren =

Species of bird

The rufous-and-white wren (Thryophilus rufalbus) is a small songbird of the wren family. It is a resident breeding species from southwesternmost Mexico to northern Colombia and northwestern Venezuela. It was formerly placed in the genus Thryothorus (Mann et al., 2006).

This large wren breeds in lowlands and foothills from sea level up to 1,500 m (4,900 ft) altitude in dry forests or, in wetter areas, more open scrubby woodland. In Central America, it mainly occurs on the Pacific side of the central mountain ranges Its flask-shaped nest is constructed 2–3 m (6 ft 7 in – 9 ft 10 in) high in a tree or shrub. The female alone incubates the three or four greenish-blue eggs for about two weeks to hatching, and the young fledge in about the same length of time again.

The adult rufous-and-white wren is 14–15 cm (5.5–5.9 in) long and weighs 22–25 g (0.78–0.88 oz). It has chestnut brown upperparts with a darker crown, strong white supercilium, brown stripe through the eye and black streaking on the cheeks. The underparts are white, with black barring on the lower belly and brown flanks. The wings and tail are barred with black. Young birds have duller upperparts and buff-tinged underparts. The subspecies T. r. minlosi of the Andean foothills of Venezuela has a greyish tinge to the crown and underparts.

The call of this species is a sharp chek or explosive tuck, and the song is a melodious and very distinctive sequence of slow hooting whistles, such as weee, boo, boo, booo, boo, whit. Pairs may duet, with the second bird responding with a purring ou-ou-ou-oouu,u,u,u.

The rufous-and-white wren forages actively in low vegetation or on the ground in pairs; it is a shy species more often heard than seen. It mainly eats insects, spiders and other invertebrates

During an El Niño-driven food shortage, rufous-and-white wrens were observed killing southern house wren nestlings, possibly to reduce competition for resources.
