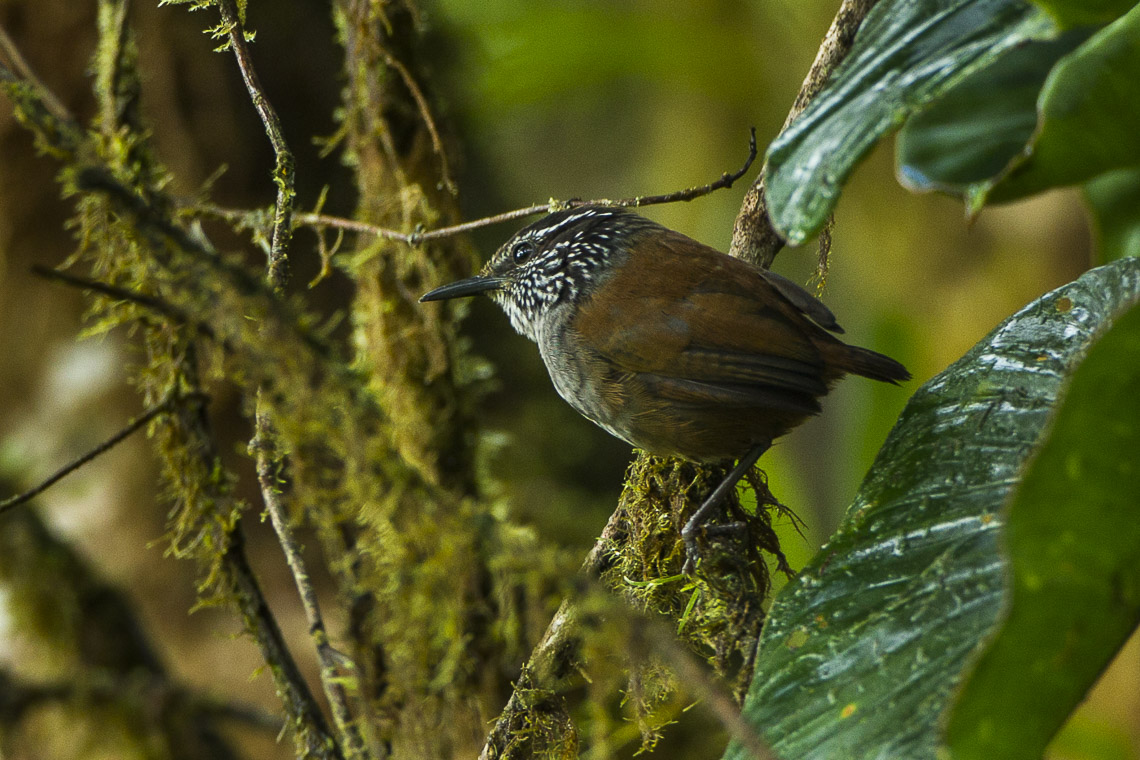
- Henicorhina leucophrys - Grey-breasted Wood Wren

Conservation status
- Least Concern (IUCN 3.1)

Scientific classification
- Kingdom: Animalia
- Phylum: Chordata
- Class: Aves
- Order: Passeriformes
- Family: Troglodytidae
- Genus: Henicorhina
- Species: H. leucophrys

Binomial name
- Henicorhina leucophrys (Tschudi, 1844)

= Grey-breasted wood wren =

Species of bird

The grey-breasted wood wren (Henicorhina leucophrys) is a species of bird in the family Troglodytidae. It is found from Mexico to Bolivia.

== Taxonomy and systematics ==
The grey-breasted wood-wren's taxonomy at the subspecies level is unsettled. According to the International Ornithological Committee (IOC), it has 17 subspecies. The Clements taxonomy and Handbook of Birds of the World (HBW) recognize 13 of them. The South American Classification Committee of the American Ornithological Society (SACC/AOS) cites a 2019 publication that "there are as many as 35 lineages within H. leucophrys that could merit recognition as species under some species concepts."

== Description ==
The nominate subspecies of grey-breasted wood wren is 10 to 11.5 cm (3.9 to 4.5 in) long and weighs 13.5 to 17.7 g (0.48 to 0.62 oz). Its crown feathers are dull black with dark brown tips. Its nape and shoulders are a dark olive brown and its lower back, rump, and tail chestnut brown. The tail has blackish bars. It has a long gray-white supercilium, a wide black stripe behind the eye, and black cheeks streaked with pale gray. Its chin and throat are pale gray, the chest and belly a darker gray, and the sides of the belly and the lower flanks a dark buff. The other subspecies differ in size, the intensity of the color of various parts, and the amount, color, and placement of streaking.

== Distribution and habitat ==
The grey-breasted wood-wren has a discontinuous range from east-central and west-central Mexico, through Central America, and in South America east into Venezuela and south to central Bolivia. It inhabits humid montane forest of many types. In elevation it is usually found above 1,500 m (4,900 ft) though it occurs as low as 400 m (1,300 ft) in Colombia and 600 m (2,000 ft) in Mexico. It is found as high as 3,000 m (9,800 ft) in Venezuela and Colombia.

== Behavior ==
=== Feeding ===
The grey-breasted wood wren forages singly or in small groups from the ground to only as high as 2 m (6.6 ft) in vegetation. Its diet appears to be solely invertebrates. It has been observed following army ant swarms in Costa Rica, Colombia, and Venezuela.

=== Breeding ===
The grey-breasted wood wren's breeding season varies throughout its range. For example, it spans from May to June in Mexico, March to June in Costa Rica, and November to June in Ecuador. The nest has a round egg chamber with a downward facing antechamber and is constructed of fibrous rootlets with moss attached to the exterior. It is placed in vegetation up to 3 m (9.8 ft) above the ground, often over a bank or ravine. Two eggs are laid and the female alone incubates them; both sexes feed the young.

=== Vocalization ===
The songs and calls of the grey-breasted wood wren vary considerably across its range. In general the songs are "a series of very loud, ringing, energetic musical phrases, frequently repeated". It sings "virtually year-round and throughout the day, in all types of weather" and is "far more commonly heard than seen."

== Status ==
The IUCN has assessed the grey-breasted wood wren as being of Least Concern. "Common or abundant in many habitats...it is not at risk in any country."
